

452001–452100 

|-bgcolor=#d6d6d6
| 452001 ||  || — || November 3, 2004 || Kitt Peak || Spacewatch || THM || align=right | 2.0 km || 
|-id=002 bgcolor=#d6d6d6
| 452002 ||  || — || November 27, 2010 || Mount Lemmon || Mount Lemmon Survey || — || align=right | 2.1 km || 
|-id=003 bgcolor=#d6d6d6
| 452003 ||  || — || September 12, 2004 || Kitt Peak || Spacewatch || — || align=right | 2.4 km || 
|-id=004 bgcolor=#d6d6d6
| 452004 ||  || — || October 28, 2010 || Mount Lemmon || Mount Lemmon Survey || — || align=right | 2.4 km || 
|-id=005 bgcolor=#d6d6d6
| 452005 ||  || — || November 2, 2010 || Mount Lemmon || Mount Lemmon Survey || KOR || align=right | 1.3 km || 
|-id=006 bgcolor=#E9E9E9
| 452006 ||  || — || May 10, 2005 || Mount Lemmon || Mount Lemmon Survey || — || align=right | 1.4 km || 
|-id=007 bgcolor=#d6d6d6
| 452007 ||  || — || January 5, 2000 || Kitt Peak || Spacewatch || — || align=right | 3.4 km || 
|-id=008 bgcolor=#E9E9E9
| 452008 ||  || — || September 27, 2006 || Mount Lemmon || Mount Lemmon Survey || — || align=right | 1.5 km || 
|-id=009 bgcolor=#d6d6d6
| 452009 ||  || — || April 3, 2008 || Kitt Peak || Spacewatch || — || align=right | 2.4 km || 
|-id=010 bgcolor=#E9E9E9
| 452010 ||  || — || December 27, 2006 || Mount Lemmon || Mount Lemmon Survey || DOR || align=right | 1.6 km || 
|-id=011 bgcolor=#E9E9E9
| 452011 ||  || — || October 18, 2006 || Kitt Peak || Spacewatch || — || align=right | 1.8 km || 
|-id=012 bgcolor=#d6d6d6
| 452012 ||  || — || July 29, 2009 || Kitt Peak || Spacewatch || 7:4 || align=right | 3.1 km || 
|-id=013 bgcolor=#E9E9E9
| 452013 ||  || — || September 18, 2010 || Mount Lemmon || Mount Lemmon Survey || — || align=right | 1.7 km || 
|-id=014 bgcolor=#d6d6d6
| 452014 ||  || — || August 25, 2004 || Kitt Peak || Spacewatch || EOS || align=right | 1.5 km || 
|-id=015 bgcolor=#d6d6d6
| 452015 ||  || — || October 17, 1995 || Kitt Peak || Spacewatch || KOR || align=right | 1.2 km || 
|-id=016 bgcolor=#E9E9E9
| 452016 ||  || — || January 20, 2012 || Mount Lemmon || Mount Lemmon Survey || HOF || align=right | 1.9 km || 
|-id=017 bgcolor=#d6d6d6
| 452017 ||  || — || March 31, 2008 || Kitt Peak || Spacewatch || KOR || align=right | 1.3 km || 
|-id=018 bgcolor=#d6d6d6
| 452018 ||  || — || September 11, 2004 || Kitt Peak || Spacewatch || — || align=right | 1.9 km || 
|-id=019 bgcolor=#d6d6d6
| 452019 ||  || — || January 9, 2011 || Kitt Peak || Spacewatch || — || align=right | 2.7 km || 
|-id=020 bgcolor=#E9E9E9
| 452020 ||  || — || February 26, 2008 || Mount Lemmon || Mount Lemmon Survey || — || align=right | 2.0 km || 
|-id=021 bgcolor=#E9E9E9
| 452021 ||  || — || July 5, 2005 || Kitt Peak || Spacewatch || — || align=right | 2.2 km || 
|-id=022 bgcolor=#E9E9E9
| 452022 ||  || — || September 19, 2010 || Kitt Peak || Spacewatch || HOF || align=right | 2.2 km || 
|-id=023 bgcolor=#E9E9E9
| 452023 ||  || — || November 24, 2011 || Mount Lemmon || Mount Lemmon Survey || AGN || align=right | 1.1 km || 
|-id=024 bgcolor=#d6d6d6
| 452024 ||  || — || November 10, 2010 || Mount Lemmon || Mount Lemmon Survey || — || align=right | 1.9 km || 
|-id=025 bgcolor=#E9E9E9
| 452025 ||  || — || March 17, 2013 || Kitt Peak || Spacewatch || — || align=right | 2.4 km || 
|-id=026 bgcolor=#E9E9E9
| 452026 ||  || — || November 23, 2006 || Kitt Peak || Spacewatch || — || align=right | 2.0 km || 
|-id=027 bgcolor=#d6d6d6
| 452027 ||  || — || May 22, 2003 || Kitt Peak || Spacewatch || — || align=right | 3.0 km || 
|-id=028 bgcolor=#E9E9E9
| 452028 ||  || — || September 30, 2006 || Mount Lemmon || Mount Lemmon Survey || — || align=right | 1.4 km || 
|-id=029 bgcolor=#d6d6d6
| 452029 ||  || — || February 21, 2007 || Mount Lemmon || Mount Lemmon Survey || EOS || align=right | 1.9 km || 
|-id=030 bgcolor=#E9E9E9
| 452030 ||  || — || July 7, 2010 || WISE || WISE || HOF || align=right | 2.5 km || 
|-id=031 bgcolor=#d6d6d6
| 452031 ||  || — || September 26, 2009 || Mount Lemmon || Mount Lemmon Survey || — || align=right | 3.2 km || 
|-id=032 bgcolor=#d6d6d6
| 452032 ||  || — || October 13, 2010 || Mount Lemmon || Mount Lemmon Survey || — || align=right | 2.5 km || 
|-id=033 bgcolor=#d6d6d6
| 452033 ||  || — || October 7, 2004 || Socorro || LINEAR || — || align=right | 2.5 km || 
|-id=034 bgcolor=#E9E9E9
| 452034 ||  || — || July 22, 2006 || Mount Lemmon || Mount Lemmon Survey || — || align=right | 1.5 km || 
|-id=035 bgcolor=#d6d6d6
| 452035 ||  || — || November 8, 2010 || Mount Lemmon || Mount Lemmon Survey || — || align=right | 2.3 km || 
|-id=036 bgcolor=#E9E9E9
| 452036 ||  || — || September 24, 2006 || Kitt Peak || Spacewatch || — || align=right | 1.3 km || 
|-id=037 bgcolor=#d6d6d6
| 452037 ||  || — || September 22, 2009 || Mount Lemmon || Mount Lemmon Survey || — || align=right | 2.7 km || 
|-id=038 bgcolor=#d6d6d6
| 452038 ||  || — || September 23, 2009 || Kitt Peak || Spacewatch || VER || align=right | 2.7 km || 
|-id=039 bgcolor=#d6d6d6
| 452039 ||  || — || September 17, 2009 || Mount Lemmon || Mount Lemmon Survey || — || align=right | 3.2 km || 
|-id=040 bgcolor=#d6d6d6
| 452040 ||  || — || December 6, 2010 || Kitt Peak || Spacewatch || — || align=right | 4.1 km || 
|-id=041 bgcolor=#E9E9E9
| 452041 ||  || — || July 9, 2010 || WISE || WISE || ADE || align=right | 2.8 km || 
|-id=042 bgcolor=#fefefe
| 452042 ||  || — || December 19, 2004 || Mount Lemmon || Mount Lemmon Survey || — || align=right | 1.1 km || 
|-id=043 bgcolor=#E9E9E9
| 452043 ||  || — || February 6, 2008 || Catalina || CSS || — || align=right | 3.7 km || 
|-id=044 bgcolor=#d6d6d6
| 452044 ||  || — || March 12, 2007 || Mount Lemmon || Mount Lemmon Survey || — || align=right | 2.2 km || 
|-id=045 bgcolor=#E9E9E9
| 452045 ||  || — || December 31, 2011 || Kitt Peak || Spacewatch || HOF || align=right | 2.1 km || 
|-id=046 bgcolor=#d6d6d6
| 452046 ||  || — || March 28, 2008 || Kitt Peak || Spacewatch || KOR || align=right | 1.0 km || 
|-id=047 bgcolor=#d6d6d6
| 452047 ||  || — || August 15, 2009 || Kitt Peak || Spacewatch || — || align=right | 2.2 km || 
|-id=048 bgcolor=#d6d6d6
| 452048 ||  || — || March 16, 2007 || Mount Lemmon || Mount Lemmon Survey || THM || align=right | 2.2 km || 
|-id=049 bgcolor=#d6d6d6
| 452049 ||  || — || November 26, 2005 || Mount Lemmon || Mount Lemmon Survey || — || align=right | 2.6 km || 
|-id=050 bgcolor=#fefefe
| 452050 ||  || — || October 8, 2007 || Mount Lemmon || Mount Lemmon Survey || — || align=right data-sort-value="0.94" | 940 m || 
|-id=051 bgcolor=#fefefe
| 452051 ||  || — || January 31, 2009 || Kitt Peak || Spacewatch || — || align=right | 1.3 km || 
|-id=052 bgcolor=#d6d6d6
| 452052 ||  || — || August 27, 2009 || Kitt Peak || Spacewatch || — || align=right | 3.1 km || 
|-id=053 bgcolor=#E9E9E9
| 452053 ||  || — || March 25, 2008 || Kitt Peak || Spacewatch || AGN || align=right | 1.1 km || 
|-id=054 bgcolor=#d6d6d6
| 452054 ||  || — || October 16, 2009 || Mount Lemmon || Mount Lemmon Survey || VER || align=right | 2.3 km || 
|-id=055 bgcolor=#d6d6d6
| 452055 ||  || — || December 29, 2005 || Kitt Peak || Spacewatch || — || align=right | 3.7 km || 
|-id=056 bgcolor=#E9E9E9
| 452056 ||  || — || April 5, 2008 || Mount Lemmon || Mount Lemmon Survey || — || align=right | 2.5 km || 
|-id=057 bgcolor=#d6d6d6
| 452057 ||  || — || October 9, 2004 || Kitt Peak || Spacewatch || EOS || align=right | 2.1 km || 
|-id=058 bgcolor=#E9E9E9
| 452058 ||  || — || September 30, 2010 || Mount Lemmon || Mount Lemmon Survey || HOF || align=right | 2.1 km || 
|-id=059 bgcolor=#E9E9E9
| 452059 ||  || — || February 9, 2008 || Mount Lemmon || Mount Lemmon Survey || — || align=right | 1.3 km || 
|-id=060 bgcolor=#d6d6d6
| 452060 ||  || — || September 30, 2010 || Mount Lemmon || Mount Lemmon Survey || KOR || align=right | 1.2 km || 
|-id=061 bgcolor=#d6d6d6
| 452061 ||  || — || October 11, 2004 || Kitt Peak || Spacewatch || THM || align=right | 1.7 km || 
|-id=062 bgcolor=#E9E9E9
| 452062 ||  || — || July 9, 2005 || Kitt Peak || Spacewatch || — || align=right | 2.2 km || 
|-id=063 bgcolor=#fefefe
| 452063 ||  || — || January 18, 2013 || Kitt Peak || Spacewatch || — || align=right data-sort-value="0.80" | 800 m || 
|-id=064 bgcolor=#E9E9E9
| 452064 ||  || — || October 18, 2006 || Kitt Peak || Spacewatch || — || align=right | 1.7 km || 
|-id=065 bgcolor=#d6d6d6
| 452065 ||  || — || October 11, 2005 || Kitt Peak || Spacewatch || KOR || align=right | 1.0 km || 
|-id=066 bgcolor=#E9E9E9
| 452066 ||  || — || November 19, 2006 || Catalina || CSS || — || align=right | 1.9 km || 
|-id=067 bgcolor=#E9E9E9
| 452067 ||  || — || March 1, 2008 || Kitt Peak || Spacewatch || — || align=right | 1.8 km || 
|-id=068 bgcolor=#d6d6d6
| 452068 ||  || — || February 23, 2007 || Mount Lemmon || Mount Lemmon Survey || — || align=right | 2.3 km || 
|-id=069 bgcolor=#d6d6d6
| 452069 ||  || — || May 8, 2008 || Mount Lemmon || Mount Lemmon Survey || EOS || align=right | 2.1 km || 
|-id=070 bgcolor=#d6d6d6
| 452070 ||  || — || September 10, 2004 || Kitt Peak || Spacewatch || — || align=right | 2.5 km || 
|-id=071 bgcolor=#d6d6d6
| 452071 ||  || — || October 3, 2005 || Kitt Peak || Spacewatch || — || align=right | 2.2 km || 
|-id=072 bgcolor=#d6d6d6
| 452072 ||  || — || December 2, 2005 || Kitt Peak || Spacewatch || EOS || align=right | 1.6 km || 
|-id=073 bgcolor=#d6d6d6
| 452073 ||  || — || October 29, 2010 || Mount Lemmon || Mount Lemmon Survey || — || align=right | 2.8 km || 
|-id=074 bgcolor=#d6d6d6
| 452074 ||  || — || January 30, 2006 || Kitt Peak || Spacewatch || — || align=right | 2.7 km || 
|-id=075 bgcolor=#d6d6d6
| 452075 ||  || — || October 3, 2008 || Mount Lemmon || Mount Lemmon Survey || 7:4 || align=right | 3.1 km || 
|-id=076 bgcolor=#d6d6d6
| 452076 ||  || — || September 29, 2005 || Mount Lemmon || Mount Lemmon Survey || KOR || align=right | 1.2 km || 
|-id=077 bgcolor=#d6d6d6
| 452077 ||  || — || May 6, 2002 || Kitt Peak || Spacewatch || VER || align=right | 2.8 km || 
|-id=078 bgcolor=#d6d6d6
| 452078 ||  || — || April 8, 2013 || Mount Lemmon || Mount Lemmon Survey || THM || align=right | 2.2 km || 
|-id=079 bgcolor=#E9E9E9
| 452079 ||  || — || December 17, 2007 || Mount Lemmon || Mount Lemmon Survey || — || align=right | 1.9 km || 
|-id=080 bgcolor=#E9E9E9
| 452080 ||  || — || September 4, 2010 || Mount Lemmon || Mount Lemmon Survey || — || align=right | 1.6 km || 
|-id=081 bgcolor=#E9E9E9
| 452081 ||  || — || February 17, 2007 || Mount Lemmon || Mount Lemmon Survey || — || align=right | 3.1 km || 
|-id=082 bgcolor=#d6d6d6
| 452082 ||  || — || September 11, 2004 || Kitt Peak || Spacewatch || — || align=right | 2.5 km || 
|-id=083 bgcolor=#d6d6d6
| 452083 ||  || — || June 16, 2009 || Mount Lemmon || Mount Lemmon Survey || EOS || align=right | 2.2 km || 
|-id=084 bgcolor=#d6d6d6
| 452084 ||  || — || March 24, 2012 || Mount Lemmon || Mount Lemmon Survey || — || align=right | 2.7 km || 
|-id=085 bgcolor=#d6d6d6
| 452085 ||  || — || January 23, 2006 || Kitt Peak || Spacewatch || — || align=right | 2.5 km || 
|-id=086 bgcolor=#fefefe
| 452086 ||  || — || September 12, 2007 || Catalina || CSS || — || align=right data-sort-value="0.76" | 760 m || 
|-id=087 bgcolor=#d6d6d6
| 452087 ||  || — || April 11, 2013 || Mount Lemmon || Mount Lemmon Survey || — || align=right | 2.9 km || 
|-id=088 bgcolor=#E9E9E9
| 452088 ||  || — || November 14, 2001 || Kitt Peak || Spacewatch || AGN || align=right | 1.4 km || 
|-id=089 bgcolor=#E9E9E9
| 452089 ||  || — || February 26, 2008 || Mount Lemmon || Mount Lemmon Survey || MRX || align=right | 1.1 km || 
|-id=090 bgcolor=#d6d6d6
| 452090 ||  || — || May 2, 2013 || Mount Lemmon || Mount Lemmon Survey || — || align=right | 2.7 km || 
|-id=091 bgcolor=#d6d6d6
| 452091 ||  || — || December 17, 2009 || Mount Lemmon || Mount Lemmon Survey || — || align=right | 4.0 km || 
|-id=092 bgcolor=#d6d6d6
| 452092 ||  || — || March 10, 2008 || Mount Lemmon || Mount Lemmon Survey || — || align=right | 2.0 km || 
|-id=093 bgcolor=#d6d6d6
| 452093 ||  || — || January 9, 2010 || Kitt Peak || Spacewatch || — || align=right | 2.9 km || 
|-id=094 bgcolor=#d6d6d6
| 452094 ||  || — || January 2, 2011 || Mount Lemmon || Mount Lemmon Survey || — || align=right | 3.0 km || 
|-id=095 bgcolor=#d6d6d6
| 452095 ||  || — || June 24, 2014 || Kitt Peak || Spacewatch || — || align=right | 2.7 km || 
|-id=096 bgcolor=#d6d6d6
| 452096 ||  || — || February 1, 2012 || Kitt Peak || Spacewatch || — || align=right | 2.9 km || 
|-id=097 bgcolor=#E9E9E9
| 452097 ||  || — || September 15, 2010 || Kitt Peak || Spacewatch || WIT || align=right data-sort-value="0.89" | 890 m || 
|-id=098 bgcolor=#d6d6d6
| 452098 ||  || — || August 18, 2009 || Kitt Peak || Spacewatch || EOS || align=right | 1.7 km || 
|-id=099 bgcolor=#E9E9E9
| 452099 ||  || — || June 24, 1995 || Kitt Peak || Spacewatch || — || align=right | 2.8 km || 
|-id=100 bgcolor=#d6d6d6
| 452100 ||  || — || February 16, 2007 || Mount Lemmon || Mount Lemmon Survey || — || align=right | 2.6 km || 
|}

452101–452200 

|-bgcolor=#d6d6d6
| 452101 ||  || — || February 25, 2007 || Mount Lemmon || Mount Lemmon Survey || — || align=right | 3.7 km || 
|-id=102 bgcolor=#d6d6d6
| 452102 ||  || — || April 11, 2008 || Mount Lemmon || Mount Lemmon Survey || — || align=right | 3.0 km || 
|-id=103 bgcolor=#d6d6d6
| 452103 ||  || — || April 22, 2007 || Mount Lemmon || Mount Lemmon Survey || — || align=right | 3.2 km || 
|-id=104 bgcolor=#d6d6d6
| 452104 ||  || — || September 17, 2009 || Mount Lemmon || Mount Lemmon Survey || EOS || align=right | 2.3 km || 
|-id=105 bgcolor=#d6d6d6
| 452105 ||  || — || December 12, 2004 || Kitt Peak || Spacewatch || — || align=right | 2.9 km || 
|-id=106 bgcolor=#d6d6d6
| 452106 ||  || — || November 3, 2010 || Kitt Peak || Spacewatch || — || align=right | 3.5 km || 
|-id=107 bgcolor=#d6d6d6
| 452107 ||  || — || April 22, 2007 || Mount Lemmon || Mount Lemmon Survey || — || align=right | 3.1 km || 
|-id=108 bgcolor=#d6d6d6
| 452108 ||  || — || March 26, 2007 || Mount Lemmon || Mount Lemmon Survey || — || align=right | 3.1 km || 
|-id=109 bgcolor=#d6d6d6
| 452109 ||  || — || February 1, 2012 || Kitt Peak || Spacewatch || — || align=right | 2.9 km || 
|-id=110 bgcolor=#d6d6d6
| 452110 ||  || — || March 18, 2001 || Kitt Peak || Spacewatch || EOS || align=right | 2.1 km || 
|-id=111 bgcolor=#E9E9E9
| 452111 ||  || — || September 11, 2005 || Kitt Peak || Spacewatch || — || align=right | 2.3 km || 
|-id=112 bgcolor=#d6d6d6
| 452112 ||  || — || March 25, 2007 || Mount Lemmon || Mount Lemmon Survey || EOS || align=right | 2.3 km || 
|-id=113 bgcolor=#d6d6d6
| 452113 ||  || — || January 30, 2006 || Kitt Peak || Spacewatch || EOS || align=right | 1.8 km || 
|-id=114 bgcolor=#d6d6d6
| 452114 ||  || — || January 19, 2012 || Mount Lemmon || Mount Lemmon Survey || — || align=right | 2.8 km || 
|-id=115 bgcolor=#d6d6d6
| 452115 ||  || — || March 13, 2012 || Mount Lemmon || Mount Lemmon Survey || — || align=right | 2.4 km || 
|-id=116 bgcolor=#d6d6d6
| 452116 ||  || — || December 8, 2010 || Mount Lemmon || Mount Lemmon Survey || — || align=right | 3.2 km || 
|-id=117 bgcolor=#d6d6d6
| 452117 ||  || — || April 23, 2001 || Kitt Peak || Spacewatch || — || align=right | 2.9 km || 
|-id=118 bgcolor=#d6d6d6
| 452118 ||  || — || February 3, 2006 || Mount Lemmon || Mount Lemmon Survey || EOS || align=right | 2.1 km || 
|-id=119 bgcolor=#d6d6d6
| 452119 ||  || — || November 30, 2005 || Kitt Peak || Spacewatch || — || align=right | 2.9 km || 
|-id=120 bgcolor=#E9E9E9
| 452120 ||  || — || September 26, 2006 || Kitt Peak || Spacewatch || — || align=right | 1.2 km || 
|-id=121 bgcolor=#d6d6d6
| 452121 ||  || — || April 11, 2007 || Kitt Peak || Spacewatch || — || align=right | 2.9 km || 
|-id=122 bgcolor=#d6d6d6
| 452122 ||  || — || January 17, 2005 || Kitt Peak || Spacewatch || — || align=right | 3.7 km || 
|-id=123 bgcolor=#E9E9E9
| 452123 ||  || — || October 26, 2005 || Kitt Peak || Spacewatch || — || align=right | 2.1 km || 
|-id=124 bgcolor=#d6d6d6
| 452124 ||  || — || October 2, 2003 || Kitt Peak || Spacewatch || — || align=right | 3.1 km || 
|-id=125 bgcolor=#E9E9E9
| 452125 ||  || — || July 9, 2004 || Socorro || LINEAR || — || align=right | 3.0 km || 
|-id=126 bgcolor=#d6d6d6
| 452126 ||  || — || June 13, 2007 || Kitt Peak || Spacewatch || — || align=right | 2.6 km || 
|-id=127 bgcolor=#fefefe
| 452127 ||  || — || March 23, 1995 || Kitt Peak || Spacewatch || — || align=right data-sort-value="0.75" | 750 m || 
|-id=128 bgcolor=#fefefe
| 452128 ||  || — || April 7, 2003 || Kitt Peak || Spacewatch || — || align=right data-sort-value="0.87" | 870 m || 
|-id=129 bgcolor=#fefefe
| 452129 ||  || — || September 27, 2000 || Socorro || LINEAR || — || align=right | 2.5 km || 
|-id=130 bgcolor=#d6d6d6
| 452130 ||  || — || July 19, 2004 || Anderson Mesa || LONEOS || — || align=right | 3.4 km || 
|-id=131 bgcolor=#d6d6d6
| 452131 ||  || — || December 1, 2004 || Catalina || CSS || — || align=right | 3.8 km || 
|-id=132 bgcolor=#d6d6d6
| 452132 ||  || — || September 30, 1999 || Catalina || CSS || — || align=right | 3.6 km || 
|-id=133 bgcolor=#d6d6d6
| 452133 ||  || — || May 19, 2010 || WISE || WISE || BRA || align=right | 2.1 km || 
|-id=134 bgcolor=#d6d6d6
| 452134 ||  || — || October 10, 2010 || Mount Lemmon || Mount Lemmon Survey || EOS || align=right | 1.7 km || 
|-id=135 bgcolor=#fefefe
| 452135 ||  || — || January 23, 2006 || Mount Lemmon || Mount Lemmon Survey || — || align=right data-sort-value="0.92" | 920 m || 
|-id=136 bgcolor=#fefefe
| 452136 ||  || — || September 23, 2004 || Kitt Peak || Spacewatch || — || align=right data-sort-value="0.84" | 840 m || 
|-id=137 bgcolor=#fefefe
| 452137 ||  || — || April 25, 2003 || Kitt Peak || Spacewatch || — || align=right data-sort-value="0.88" | 880 m || 
|-id=138 bgcolor=#E9E9E9
| 452138 ||  || — || May 5, 2000 || Kitt Peak || Spacewatch || — || align=right | 3.1 km || 
|-id=139 bgcolor=#E9E9E9
| 452139 ||  || — || December 29, 2003 || Kitt Peak || Spacewatch || — || align=right | 1.4 km || 
|-id=140 bgcolor=#FA8072
| 452140 ||  || — || November 2, 2007 || Mount Lemmon || Mount Lemmon Survey || — || align=right data-sort-value="0.78" | 780 m || 
|-id=141 bgcolor=#d6d6d6
| 452141 ||  || — || October 23, 2005 || Catalina || CSS || — || align=right | 2.9 km || 
|-id=142 bgcolor=#fefefe
| 452142 ||  || — || February 9, 2005 || Kitt Peak || Spacewatch || — || align=right | 1.0 km || 
|-id=143 bgcolor=#fefefe
| 452143 ||  || — || September 13, 2007 || Kitt Peak || Spacewatch || H || align=right data-sort-value="0.74" | 740 m || 
|-id=144 bgcolor=#fefefe
| 452144 ||  || — || October 11, 1977 || Palomar || PLS || — || align=right data-sort-value="0.67" | 670 m || 
|-id=145 bgcolor=#d6d6d6
| 452145 ||  || — || October 2, 2000 || Kitt Peak || Spacewatch || — || align=right | 2.9 km || 
|-id=146 bgcolor=#d6d6d6
| 452146 ||  || — || September 11, 2004 || Kitt Peak || Spacewatch || THM || align=right | 2.1 km || 
|-id=147 bgcolor=#fefefe
| 452147 ||  || — || October 1, 2005 || Catalina || CSS || H || align=right data-sort-value="0.77" | 770 m || 
|-id=148 bgcolor=#d6d6d6
| 452148 ||  || — || June 19, 2009 || Kitt Peak || Spacewatch || — || align=right | 2.9 km || 
|-id=149 bgcolor=#d6d6d6
| 452149 ||  || — || December 2, 2010 || Mount Lemmon || Mount Lemmon Survey || — || align=right | 3.3 km || 
|-id=150 bgcolor=#fefefe
| 452150 ||  || — || December 2, 2005 || Kitt Peak || Spacewatch || V || align=right data-sort-value="0.58" | 580 m || 
|-id=151 bgcolor=#fefefe
| 452151 ||  || — || October 9, 2004 || Kitt Peak || Spacewatch || MAS || align=right data-sort-value="0.63" | 630 m || 
|-id=152 bgcolor=#d6d6d6
| 452152 ||  || — || January 24, 1996 || Kitt Peak || Spacewatch || — || align=right | 2.9 km || 
|-id=153 bgcolor=#fefefe
| 452153 ||  || — || December 11, 2004 || Kitt Peak || Spacewatch || NYS || align=right data-sort-value="0.63" | 630 m || 
|-id=154 bgcolor=#d6d6d6
| 452154 ||  || — || October 11, 2010 || Catalina || CSS || — || align=right | 2.9 km || 
|-id=155 bgcolor=#fefefe
| 452155 ||  || — || September 12, 2004 || Kitt Peak || Spacewatch || V || align=right data-sort-value="0.52" | 520 m || 
|-id=156 bgcolor=#d6d6d6
| 452156 ||  || — || March 10, 2008 || Kitt Peak || Spacewatch || — || align=right | 2.8 km || 
|-id=157 bgcolor=#d6d6d6
| 452157 ||  || — || August 29, 2005 || Kitt Peak || Spacewatch || — || align=right | 2.1 km || 
|-id=158 bgcolor=#fefefe
| 452158 ||  || — || September 22, 2004 || Kitt Peak || Spacewatch || NYS || align=right data-sort-value="0.58" | 580 m || 
|-id=159 bgcolor=#d6d6d6
| 452159 ||  || — || April 6, 2008 || Mount Lemmon || Mount Lemmon Survey || EOS || align=right | 1.9 km || 
|-id=160 bgcolor=#fefefe
| 452160 ||  || — || November 9, 2008 || Mount Lemmon || Mount Lemmon Survey || — || align=right data-sort-value="0.63" | 630 m || 
|-id=161 bgcolor=#E9E9E9
| 452161 ||  || — || September 26, 2006 || Mount Lemmon || Mount Lemmon Survey || HOF || align=right | 3.6 km || 
|-id=162 bgcolor=#E9E9E9
| 452162 ||  || — || March 3, 2009 || Mount Lemmon || Mount Lemmon Survey || — || align=right | 3.0 km || 
|-id=163 bgcolor=#d6d6d6
| 452163 ||  || — || November 17, 2006 || Kitt Peak || Spacewatch || — || align=right | 2.6 km || 
|-id=164 bgcolor=#d6d6d6
| 452164 ||  || — || June 3, 2010 || WISE || WISE || — || align=right | 2.9 km || 
|-id=165 bgcolor=#E9E9E9
| 452165 ||  || — || October 21, 2011 || Kitt Peak || Spacewatch || — || align=right | 1.1 km || 
|-id=166 bgcolor=#E9E9E9
| 452166 ||  || — || October 3, 2003 || Kitt Peak || Spacewatch || — || align=right data-sort-value="0.88" | 880 m || 
|-id=167 bgcolor=#d6d6d6
| 452167 ||  || — || April 6, 2002 || Kitt Peak || Spacewatch || — || align=right | 3.4 km || 
|-id=168 bgcolor=#E9E9E9
| 452168 ||  || — || May 9, 2010 || Mount Lemmon || Mount Lemmon Survey || (5) || align=right | 1.9 km || 
|-id=169 bgcolor=#d6d6d6
| 452169 ||  || — || August 30, 2005 || Kitt Peak || Spacewatch || EOS || align=right | 1.9 km || 
|-id=170 bgcolor=#fefefe
| 452170 ||  || — || April 25, 2003 || Kitt Peak || Spacewatch || MAS || align=right data-sort-value="0.74" | 740 m || 
|-id=171 bgcolor=#d6d6d6
| 452171 ||  || — || December 1, 2005 || Kitt Peak || Spacewatch || — || align=right | 1.9 km || 
|-id=172 bgcolor=#E9E9E9
| 452172 ||  || — || March 3, 2000 || Kitt Peak || Spacewatch || — || align=right | 1.5 km || 
|-id=173 bgcolor=#E9E9E9
| 452173 ||  || — || November 18, 2011 || Mount Lemmon || Mount Lemmon Survey || — || align=right | 1.4 km || 
|-id=174 bgcolor=#E9E9E9
| 452174 ||  || — || January 30, 2004 || Kitt Peak || Spacewatch || — || align=right | 1.2 km || 
|-id=175 bgcolor=#E9E9E9
| 452175 ||  || — || August 27, 2006 || Kitt Peak || Spacewatch || EUN || align=right | 1.2 km || 
|-id=176 bgcolor=#FA8072
| 452176 ||  || — || November 13, 2002 || Socorro || LINEAR || H || align=right data-sort-value="0.58" | 580 m || 
|-id=177 bgcolor=#d6d6d6
| 452177 ||  || — || April 6, 2008 || Kitt Peak || Spacewatch || — || align=right | 2.7 km || 
|-id=178 bgcolor=#E9E9E9
| 452178 ||  || — || April 16, 2010 || WISE || WISE || DOR || align=right | 2.1 km || 
|-id=179 bgcolor=#E9E9E9
| 452179 ||  || — || February 8, 2008 || Kitt Peak || Spacewatch || — || align=right | 2.3 km || 
|-id=180 bgcolor=#d6d6d6
| 452180 ||  || — || July 28, 2010 || WISE || WISE || EOS || align=right | 4.3 km || 
|-id=181 bgcolor=#fefefe
| 452181 ||  || — || October 13, 2004 || Kitt Peak || Spacewatch || MAS || align=right data-sort-value="0.82" | 820 m || 
|-id=182 bgcolor=#fefefe
| 452182 ||  || — || February 4, 2005 || Catalina || CSS || — || align=right | 1.1 km || 
|-id=183 bgcolor=#fefefe
| 452183 ||  || — || March 3, 2006 || Kitt Peak || Spacewatch || H || align=right data-sort-value="0.71" | 710 m || 
|-id=184 bgcolor=#fefefe
| 452184 ||  || — || August 31, 2000 || Socorro || LINEAR || — || align=right | 1.1 km || 
|-id=185 bgcolor=#d6d6d6
| 452185 ||  || — || December 2, 2004 || Catalina || CSS || — || align=right | 3.3 km || 
|-id=186 bgcolor=#fefefe
| 452186 ||  || — || December 2, 2005 || Kitt Peak || Spacewatch || — || align=right data-sort-value="0.68" | 680 m || 
|-id=187 bgcolor=#d6d6d6
| 452187 ||  || — || March 13, 2002 || Socorro || LINEAR || — || align=right | 3.8 km || 
|-id=188 bgcolor=#d6d6d6
| 452188 ||  || — || May 15, 2009 || Kitt Peak || Spacewatch || — || align=right | 2.4 km || 
|-id=189 bgcolor=#E9E9E9
| 452189 ||  || — || October 20, 1998 || Kitt Peak || Spacewatch || — || align=right | 1.1 km || 
|-id=190 bgcolor=#E9E9E9
| 452190 ||  || — || October 12, 2007 || Mount Lemmon || Mount Lemmon Survey || (5) || align=right data-sort-value="0.80" | 800 m || 
|-id=191 bgcolor=#fefefe
| 452191 ||  || — || December 10, 2004 || Kitt Peak || Spacewatch || MAS || align=right data-sort-value="0.71" | 710 m || 
|-id=192 bgcolor=#fefefe
| 452192 ||  || — || November 25, 2009 || Kitt Peak || Spacewatch || — || align=right data-sort-value="0.67" | 670 m || 
|-id=193 bgcolor=#fefefe
| 452193 ||  || — || December 30, 2005 || Mount Lemmon || Mount Lemmon Survey || — || align=right data-sort-value="0.81" | 810 m || 
|-id=194 bgcolor=#d6d6d6
| 452194 ||  || — || October 7, 2004 || Kitt Peak || Spacewatch || — || align=right | 3.0 km || 
|-id=195 bgcolor=#fefefe
| 452195 ||  || — || September 16, 2004 || Anderson Mesa || LONEOS || MAS || align=right data-sort-value="0.90" | 900 m || 
|-id=196 bgcolor=#fefefe
| 452196 ||  || — || May 8, 2008 || Kitt Peak || Spacewatch || — || align=right data-sort-value="0.56" | 560 m || 
|-id=197 bgcolor=#fefefe
| 452197 ||  || — || December 20, 2004 || Mount Lemmon || Mount Lemmon Survey || — || align=right | 1.0 km || 
|-id=198 bgcolor=#d6d6d6
| 452198 ||  || — || February 20, 2006 || Kitt Peak || Spacewatch || — || align=right | 3.2 km || 
|-id=199 bgcolor=#fefefe
| 452199 ||  || — || September 22, 2008 || Mount Lemmon || Mount Lemmon Survey || NYS || align=right data-sort-value="0.55" | 550 m || 
|-id=200 bgcolor=#fefefe
| 452200 ||  || — || December 3, 2004 || Kitt Peak || Spacewatch || MAS || align=right data-sort-value="0.75" | 750 m || 
|}

452201–452300 

|-bgcolor=#E9E9E9
| 452201 ||  || — || September 11, 2007 || Kitt Peak || Spacewatch || — || align=right data-sort-value="0.80" | 800 m || 
|-id=202 bgcolor=#d6d6d6
| 452202 ||  || — || February 11, 2002 || Socorro || LINEAR || 3:2 || align=right | 4.6 km || 
|-id=203 bgcolor=#d6d6d6
| 452203 ||  || — || March 28, 2008 || Mount Lemmon || Mount Lemmon Survey || — || align=right | 2.2 km || 
|-id=204 bgcolor=#E9E9E9
| 452204 ||  || — || October 11, 2007 || Kitt Peak || Spacewatch || RAF || align=right data-sort-value="0.94" | 940 m || 
|-id=205 bgcolor=#fefefe
| 452205 ||  || — || October 1, 2005 || Mount Lemmon || Mount Lemmon Survey || — || align=right data-sort-value="0.58" | 580 m || 
|-id=206 bgcolor=#E9E9E9
| 452206 ||  || — || September 28, 2006 || Kitt Peak || Spacewatch || — || align=right | 2.4 km || 
|-id=207 bgcolor=#fefefe
| 452207 ||  || — || October 10, 2004 || Kitt Peak || Spacewatch || — || align=right data-sort-value="0.97" | 970 m || 
|-id=208 bgcolor=#fefefe
| 452208 ||  || — || October 28, 2008 || Mount Lemmon || Mount Lemmon Survey || — || align=right data-sort-value="0.65" | 650 m || 
|-id=209 bgcolor=#d6d6d6
| 452209 ||  || — || April 13, 2004 || Kitt Peak || Spacewatch || — || align=right | 2.0 km || 
|-id=210 bgcolor=#fefefe
| 452210 ||  || — || February 24, 2009 || Catalina || CSS || — || align=right data-sort-value="0.98" | 980 m || 
|-id=211 bgcolor=#fefefe
| 452211 ||  || — || November 10, 1996 || Kitt Peak || Spacewatch || — || align=right data-sort-value="0.89" | 890 m || 
|-id=212 bgcolor=#fefefe
| 452212 ||  || — || November 17, 2006 || Kitt Peak || Spacewatch || — || align=right data-sort-value="0.65" | 650 m || 
|-id=213 bgcolor=#d6d6d6
| 452213 ||  || — || September 13, 2005 || Kitt Peak || Spacewatch || — || align=right | 2.2 km || 
|-id=214 bgcolor=#fefefe
| 452214 ||  || — || October 25, 2005 || Kitt Peak || Spacewatch || — || align=right data-sort-value="0.74" | 740 m || 
|-id=215 bgcolor=#E9E9E9
| 452215 ||  || — || September 16, 2006 || Kitt Peak || Spacewatch || — || align=right | 2.1 km || 
|-id=216 bgcolor=#fefefe
| 452216 ||  || — || October 10, 1993 || Kitt Peak || Spacewatch || — || align=right data-sort-value="0.68" | 680 m || 
|-id=217 bgcolor=#fefefe
| 452217 ||  || — || February 27, 2006 || Kitt Peak || Spacewatch || — || align=right data-sort-value="0.81" | 810 m || 
|-id=218 bgcolor=#fefefe
| 452218 ||  || — || September 19, 1996 || Kitt Peak || Spacewatch || — || align=right data-sort-value="0.82" | 820 m || 
|-id=219 bgcolor=#d6d6d6
| 452219 ||  || — || November 1, 2010 || Mount Lemmon || Mount Lemmon Survey || critical || align=right | 2.2 km || 
|-id=220 bgcolor=#d6d6d6
| 452220 ||  || — || October 27, 2005 || Kitt Peak || Spacewatch || — || align=right | 2.6 km || 
|-id=221 bgcolor=#fefefe
| 452221 ||  || — || April 15, 2010 || Mount Lemmon || Mount Lemmon Survey || — || align=right data-sort-value="0.75" | 750 m || 
|-id=222 bgcolor=#d6d6d6
| 452222 ||  || — || January 26, 2006 || Kitt Peak || Spacewatch || LIX || align=right | 3.8 km || 
|-id=223 bgcolor=#E9E9E9
| 452223 ||  || — || December 4, 2007 || Mount Lemmon || Mount Lemmon Survey || — || align=right | 1.3 km || 
|-id=224 bgcolor=#d6d6d6
| 452224 ||  || — || January 23, 2006 || Mount Lemmon || Mount Lemmon Survey || — || align=right | 3.1 km || 
|-id=225 bgcolor=#fefefe
| 452225 ||  || — || October 27, 2008 || Mount Lemmon || Mount Lemmon Survey || — || align=right data-sort-value="0.62" | 620 m || 
|-id=226 bgcolor=#d6d6d6
| 452226 ||  || — || November 8, 2010 || Mount Lemmon || Mount Lemmon Survey || — || align=right | 1.9 km || 
|-id=227 bgcolor=#d6d6d6
| 452227 ||  || — || December 5, 2010 || Kitt Peak || Spacewatch || — || align=right | 4.0 km || 
|-id=228 bgcolor=#E9E9E9
| 452228 ||  || — || October 21, 2007 || Mount Lemmon || Mount Lemmon Survey || — || align=right | 1.1 km || 
|-id=229 bgcolor=#d6d6d6
| 452229 ||  || — || February 1, 2006 || Kitt Peak || Spacewatch || — || align=right | 3.6 km || 
|-id=230 bgcolor=#E9E9E9
| 452230 ||  || — || April 20, 2009 || Catalina || CSS || ADE || align=right | 2.2 km || 
|-id=231 bgcolor=#fefefe
| 452231 ||  || — || June 10, 2011 || Mount Lemmon || Mount Lemmon Survey || — || align=right | 1.1 km || 
|-id=232 bgcolor=#E9E9E9
| 452232 ||  || — || October 9, 2007 || Kitt Peak || Spacewatch || — || align=right data-sort-value="0.86" | 860 m || 
|-id=233 bgcolor=#d6d6d6
| 452233 ||  || — || August 18, 2009 || Kitt Peak || Spacewatch || — || align=right | 3.5 km || 
|-id=234 bgcolor=#E9E9E9
| 452234 ||  || — || December 30, 2008 || Mount Lemmon || Mount Lemmon Survey || — || align=right | 3.7 km || 
|-id=235 bgcolor=#d6d6d6
| 452235 ||  || — || June 29, 1995 || Kitt Peak || Spacewatch || — || align=right | 3.1 km || 
|-id=236 bgcolor=#d6d6d6
| 452236 ||  || — || February 8, 2007 || Mount Lemmon || Mount Lemmon Survey || EOS || align=right | 2.0 km || 
|-id=237 bgcolor=#E9E9E9
| 452237 ||  || — || February 6, 2008 || Catalina || CSS || — || align=right | 1.7 km || 
|-id=238 bgcolor=#fefefe
| 452238 ||  || — || August 27, 2005 || Anderson Mesa || LONEOS || — || align=right data-sort-value="0.71" | 710 m || 
|-id=239 bgcolor=#d6d6d6
| 452239 ||  || — || October 5, 2005 || Catalina || CSS || — || align=right | 3.3 km || 
|-id=240 bgcolor=#d6d6d6
| 452240 ||  || — || June 26, 2003 || Socorro || LINEAR || Tj (2.98) || align=right | 5.5 km || 
|-id=241 bgcolor=#fefefe
| 452241 ||  || — || April 5, 2000 || Kitt Peak || Spacewatch || — || align=right data-sort-value="0.82" | 820 m || 
|-id=242 bgcolor=#fefefe
| 452242 ||  || — || October 9, 2004 || Kitt Peak || Spacewatch || NYS || align=right data-sort-value="0.71" | 710 m || 
|-id=243 bgcolor=#d6d6d6
| 452243 ||  || — || October 11, 2004 || Kitt Peak || Spacewatch || — || align=right | 3.3 km || 
|-id=244 bgcolor=#d6d6d6
| 452244 ||  || — || December 16, 2004 || Anderson Mesa || LONEOS || — || align=right | 5.1 km || 
|-id=245 bgcolor=#fefefe
| 452245 ||  || — || April 25, 2007 || Mount Lemmon || Mount Lemmon Survey || — || align=right data-sort-value="0.90" | 900 m || 
|-id=246 bgcolor=#E9E9E9
| 452246 ||  || — || November 18, 2006 || Kitt Peak || Spacewatch || MRX || align=right data-sort-value="0.89" | 890 m || 
|-id=247 bgcolor=#E9E9E9
| 452247 ||  || — || April 7, 2013 || Mount Lemmon || Mount Lemmon Survey || (5) || align=right | 1.1 km || 
|-id=248 bgcolor=#fefefe
| 452248 ||  || — || June 11, 2011 || Mount Lemmon || Mount Lemmon Survey || NYS || align=right data-sort-value="0.69" | 690 m || 
|-id=249 bgcolor=#fefefe
| 452249 ||  || — || August 23, 2008 || Siding Spring || SSS || — || align=right data-sort-value="0.90" | 900 m || 
|-id=250 bgcolor=#E9E9E9
| 452250 ||  || — || May 11, 2010 || Mount Lemmon || Mount Lemmon Survey || (5) || align=right data-sort-value="0.82" | 820 m || 
|-id=251 bgcolor=#E9E9E9
| 452251 ||  || — || September 1, 2010 || Mount Lemmon || Mount Lemmon Survey || — || align=right | 1.7 km || 
|-id=252 bgcolor=#fefefe
| 452252 ||  || — || December 9, 2004 || Kitt Peak || Spacewatch || — || align=right | 1.0 km || 
|-id=253 bgcolor=#d6d6d6
| 452253 ||  || — || January 17, 2010 || WISE || WISE || — || align=right | 2.2 km || 
|-id=254 bgcolor=#E9E9E9
| 452254 ||  || — || February 1, 2012 || Kitt Peak || Spacewatch || — || align=right | 2.4 km || 
|-id=255 bgcolor=#E9E9E9
| 452255 ||  || — || February 7, 1999 || Kitt Peak || Spacewatch || ADE || align=right | 2.2 km || 
|-id=256 bgcolor=#d6d6d6
| 452256 ||  || — || February 14, 2010 || WISE || WISE || — || align=right | 3.8 km || 
|-id=257 bgcolor=#E9E9E9
| 452257 ||  || — || February 11, 2008 || Mount Lemmon || Mount Lemmon Survey || — || align=right | 2.2 km || 
|-id=258 bgcolor=#d6d6d6
| 452258 ||  || — || January 19, 1994 || Kitt Peak || Spacewatch || — || align=right | 3.4 km || 
|-id=259 bgcolor=#d6d6d6
| 452259 ||  || — || February 3, 2000 || Kitt Peak || Spacewatch || — || align=right | 2.3 km || 
|-id=260 bgcolor=#d6d6d6
| 452260 ||  || — || May 17, 2002 || Kitt Peak || Spacewatch || EOS || align=right | 2.8 km || 
|-id=261 bgcolor=#E9E9E9
| 452261 ||  || — || February 20, 2009 || Kitt Peak || Spacewatch || EUN || align=right | 1.4 km || 
|-id=262 bgcolor=#d6d6d6
| 452262 ||  || — || November 25, 2005 || Catalina || CSS || EOS || align=right | 2.4 km || 
|-id=263 bgcolor=#d6d6d6
| 452263 ||  || — || May 12, 2007 || Mount Lemmon || Mount Lemmon Survey || — || align=right | 4.2 km || 
|-id=264 bgcolor=#d6d6d6
| 452264 ||  || — || December 1, 2005 || Kitt Peak || Spacewatch || — || align=right | 3.2 km || 
|-id=265 bgcolor=#d6d6d6
| 452265 ||  || — || January 25, 2006 || Kitt Peak || Spacewatch || — || align=right | 2.5 km || 
|-id=266 bgcolor=#fefefe
| 452266 ||  || — || March 15, 2007 || Kitt Peak || Spacewatch || — || align=right data-sort-value="0.73" | 730 m || 
|-id=267 bgcolor=#E9E9E9
| 452267 ||  || — || November 8, 2007 || Mount Lemmon || Mount Lemmon Survey || — || align=right | 1.0 km || 
|-id=268 bgcolor=#d6d6d6
| 452268 ||  || — || October 9, 2004 || Kitt Peak || Spacewatch || — || align=right | 3.2 km || 
|-id=269 bgcolor=#E9E9E9
| 452269 ||  || — || February 14, 2004 || Kitt Peak || Spacewatch || — || align=right | 2.5 km || 
|-id=270 bgcolor=#d6d6d6
| 452270 ||  || — || September 7, 2004 || Kitt Peak || Spacewatch || — || align=right | 2.6 km || 
|-id=271 bgcolor=#E9E9E9
| 452271 ||  || — || October 23, 2011 || Kitt Peak || Spacewatch || — || align=right | 1.7 km || 
|-id=272 bgcolor=#fefefe
| 452272 ||  || — || September 11, 2004 || Kitt Peak || Spacewatch || — || align=right data-sort-value="0.71" | 710 m || 
|-id=273 bgcolor=#fefefe
| 452273 ||  || — || January 4, 2006 || Kitt Peak || Spacewatch || NYS || align=right data-sort-value="0.52" | 520 m || 
|-id=274 bgcolor=#E9E9E9
| 452274 ||  || — || November 18, 2007 || Kitt Peak || Spacewatch || — || align=right | 1.4 km || 
|-id=275 bgcolor=#E9E9E9
| 452275 ||  || — || April 7, 2005 || Kitt Peak || Spacewatch || — || align=right | 1.8 km || 
|-id=276 bgcolor=#fefefe
| 452276 ||  || — || December 29, 2008 || Mount Lemmon || Mount Lemmon Survey || MAS || align=right data-sort-value="0.65" | 650 m || 
|-id=277 bgcolor=#d6d6d6
| 452277 ||  || — || April 4, 2008 || Kitt Peak || Spacewatch || TRE || align=right | 3.4 km || 
|-id=278 bgcolor=#fefefe
| 452278 ||  || — || April 11, 2003 || Kitt Peak || Spacewatch || — || align=right data-sort-value="0.85" | 850 m || 
|-id=279 bgcolor=#fefefe
| 452279 ||  || — || December 31, 2008 || Kitt Peak || Spacewatch || — || align=right data-sort-value="0.73" | 730 m || 
|-id=280 bgcolor=#fefefe
| 452280 ||  || — || June 22, 2011 || Mount Lemmon || Mount Lemmon Survey || NYS || align=right data-sort-value="0.72" | 720 m || 
|-id=281 bgcolor=#fefefe
| 452281 ||  || — || April 1, 2008 || Kitt Peak || Spacewatch || — || align=right data-sort-value="0.91" | 910 m || 
|-id=282 bgcolor=#fefefe
| 452282 ||  || — || February 16, 2001 || Kitt Peak || Spacewatch || — || align=right data-sort-value="0.78" | 780 m || 
|-id=283 bgcolor=#fefefe
| 452283 ||  || — || October 30, 2005 || Mount Lemmon || Mount Lemmon Survey || — || align=right data-sort-value="0.72" | 720 m || 
|-id=284 bgcolor=#d6d6d6
| 452284 ||  || — || November 11, 2010 || Catalina || CSS || EOS || align=right | 2.7 km || 
|-id=285 bgcolor=#fefefe
| 452285 ||  || — || October 4, 2004 || Kitt Peak || Spacewatch || MAS || align=right data-sort-value="0.75" | 750 m || 
|-id=286 bgcolor=#fefefe
| 452286 ||  || — || September 9, 2004 || Anderson Mesa || LONEOS || — || align=right data-sort-value="0.78" | 780 m || 
|-id=287 bgcolor=#d6d6d6
| 452287 ||  || — || April 3, 2000 || Kitt Peak || Spacewatch || — || align=right | 3.6 km || 
|-id=288 bgcolor=#E9E9E9
| 452288 ||  || — || February 13, 2004 || Kitt Peak || Spacewatch || — || align=right | 1.9 km || 
|-id=289 bgcolor=#fefefe
| 452289 ||  || — || February 7, 2002 || Kitt Peak || Spacewatch || — || align=right data-sort-value="0.82" | 820 m || 
|-id=290 bgcolor=#d6d6d6
| 452290 ||  || — || November 3, 2004 || Kitt Peak || Spacewatch || — || align=right | 3.0 km || 
|-id=291 bgcolor=#fefefe
| 452291 ||  || — || October 4, 2004 || Kitt Peak || Spacewatch || — || align=right data-sort-value="0.57" | 570 m || 
|-id=292 bgcolor=#fefefe
| 452292 ||  || — || November 1, 2000 || Socorro || LINEAR || — || align=right data-sort-value="0.86" | 860 m || 
|-id=293 bgcolor=#E9E9E9
| 452293 ||  || — || April 8, 2010 || WISE || WISE || — || align=right | 2.0 km || 
|-id=294 bgcolor=#fefefe
| 452294 ||  || — || September 3, 2008 || Kitt Peak || Spacewatch || — || align=right data-sort-value="0.65" | 650 m || 
|-id=295 bgcolor=#E9E9E9
| 452295 ||  || — || December 16, 2003 || Kitt Peak || Spacewatch || — || align=right | 1.1 km || 
|-id=296 bgcolor=#E9E9E9
| 452296 ||  || — || April 30, 2009 || Kitt Peak || Spacewatch || — || align=right | 2.8 km || 
|-id=297 bgcolor=#fefefe
| 452297 ||  || — || October 8, 2008 || Catalina || CSS || — || align=right data-sort-value="0.94" | 940 m || 
|-id=298 bgcolor=#E9E9E9
| 452298 ||  || — || October 20, 2011 || Mount Lemmon || Mount Lemmon Survey || — || align=right | 1.3 km || 
|-id=299 bgcolor=#d6d6d6
| 452299 ||  || — || October 12, 1993 || La Silla || E. W. Elst || — || align=right | 2.9 km || 
|-id=300 bgcolor=#fefefe
| 452300 ||  || — || October 4, 1994 || Kitt Peak || Spacewatch || — || align=right data-sort-value="0.65" | 650 m || 
|}

452301–452400 

|-bgcolor=#E9E9E9
| 452301 ||  || — || October 28, 1994 || Kitt Peak || Spacewatch || — || align=right data-sort-value="0.98" | 980 m || 
|-id=302 bgcolor=#FFC2E0
| 452302 ||  || — || December 20, 1995 || Kitt Peak || Spacewatch || APOPHA || align=right data-sort-value="0.32" | 320 m || 
|-id=303 bgcolor=#E9E9E9
| 452303 ||  || — || September 9, 1996 || Prescott || P. G. Comba ||  || align=right | 2.2 km || 
|-id=304 bgcolor=#fefefe
| 452304 ||  || — || November 5, 1996 || Kitt Peak || Spacewatch || critical || align=right data-sort-value="0.68" | 680 m || 
|-id=305 bgcolor=#d6d6d6
| 452305 ||  || — || January 31, 1997 || Kitt Peak || Spacewatch || BRA || align=right | 1.6 km || 
|-id=306 bgcolor=#E9E9E9
| 452306 ||  || — || April 12, 1997 || Kitt Peak || Spacewatch || — || align=right | 1.8 km || 
|-id=307 bgcolor=#FFC2E0
| 452307 Manawydan ||  ||  || December 5, 1997 || Caussols || ODAS || AMO || align=right data-sort-value="0.73" | 730 m || 
|-id=308 bgcolor=#d6d6d6
| 452308 ||  || — || September 26, 1998 || Socorro || LINEAR || — || align=right | 3.2 km || 
|-id=309 bgcolor=#E9E9E9
| 452309 ||  || — || September 26, 1998 || Socorro || LINEAR || — || align=right | 1.0 km || 
|-id=310 bgcolor=#E9E9E9
| 452310 ||  || — || October 23, 1998 || Kitt Peak || Spacewatch || — || align=right | 1.6 km || 
|-id=311 bgcolor=#d6d6d6
| 452311 ||  || — || November 14, 1998 || Kitt Peak || Spacewatch || — || align=right | 2.3 km || 
|-id=312 bgcolor=#E9E9E9
| 452312 ||  || — || November 15, 1998 || Kitt Peak || Spacewatch || — || align=right | 1.2 km || 
|-id=313 bgcolor=#FFC2E0
| 452313 ||  || — || December 15, 1998 || Socorro || LINEAR || APOcritical || align=right | 1.5 km || 
|-id=314 bgcolor=#FFC2E0
| 452314 ||  || — || June 12, 1999 || Socorro || LINEAR || AMO || align=right data-sort-value="0.53" | 530 m || 
|-id=315 bgcolor=#d6d6d6
| 452315 ||  || — || November 4, 1999 || Kitt Peak || Spacewatch || 3:2critical || align=right | 3.7 km || 
|-id=316 bgcolor=#d6d6d6
| 452316 ||  || — || December 5, 1999 || Catalina || CSS || — || align=right | 3.2 km || 
|-id=317 bgcolor=#FA8072
| 452317 ||  || — || December 15, 1999 || Kitt Peak || Spacewatch || H || align=right data-sort-value="0.64" | 640 m || 
|-id=318 bgcolor=#d6d6d6
| 452318 ||  || — || December 7, 1999 || Kitt Peak || Spacewatch || — || align=right | 3.6 km || 
|-id=319 bgcolor=#E9E9E9
| 452319 ||  || — || January 2, 2000 || Kitt Peak || Spacewatch || — || align=right | 1.2 km || 
|-id=320 bgcolor=#E9E9E9
| 452320 ||  || — || March 3, 2000 || Kitt Peak || Spacewatch || — || align=right data-sort-value="0.83" | 830 m || 
|-id=321 bgcolor=#E9E9E9
| 452321 ||  || — || March 25, 2000 || Kitt Peak || Spacewatch || — || align=right data-sort-value="0.78" | 780 m || 
|-id=322 bgcolor=#fefefe
| 452322 ||  || — || April 5, 2000 || Kitt Peak || Spacewatch || — || align=right data-sort-value="0.62" | 620 m || 
|-id=323 bgcolor=#E9E9E9
| 452323 ||  || — || May 24, 2000 || Kitt Peak || Spacewatch || — || align=right | 1.3 km || 
|-id=324 bgcolor=#d6d6d6
| 452324 ||  || — || September 23, 2000 || Socorro || LINEAR || — || align=right | 2.8 km || 
|-id=325 bgcolor=#fefefe
| 452325 ||  || — || September 26, 2000 || Socorro || LINEAR || MAS || align=right data-sort-value="0.88" | 880 m || 
|-id=326 bgcolor=#E9E9E9
| 452326 ||  || — || September 22, 2000 || Socorro || LINEAR || JUN || align=right | 1.5 km || 
|-id=327 bgcolor=#FA8072
| 452327 ||  || — || September 27, 2000 || Kitt Peak || Spacewatch || — || align=right data-sort-value="0.85" | 850 m || 
|-id=328 bgcolor=#d6d6d6
| 452328 ||  || — || September 24, 2000 || Socorro || LINEAR || — || align=right | 3.0 km || 
|-id=329 bgcolor=#d6d6d6
| 452329 ||  || — || September 23, 2000 || Socorro || LINEAR || — || align=right | 2.4 km || 
|-id=330 bgcolor=#fefefe
| 452330 ||  || — || September 28, 2000 || Socorro || LINEAR || — || align=right | 1.3 km || 
|-id=331 bgcolor=#fefefe
| 452331 ||  || — || November 24, 2000 || Bergisch Gladbach || W. Bickel || MAS || align=right data-sort-value="0.79" | 790 m || 
|-id=332 bgcolor=#fefefe
| 452332 ||  || — || January 20, 2001 || Socorro || LINEAR || — || align=right data-sort-value="0.95" | 950 m || 
|-id=333 bgcolor=#d6d6d6
| 452333 || 2001 JO || — || May 2, 2001 || Palomar || NEAT || Tj (2.85) || align=right | 4.9 km || 
|-id=334 bgcolor=#FFC2E0
| 452334 ||  || — || June 1, 2001 || Socorro || LINEAR || APOcritical || align=right data-sort-value="0.22" | 220 m || 
|-id=335 bgcolor=#E9E9E9
| 452335 ||  || — || July 21, 2001 || Palomar || NEAT || — || align=right | 2.8 km || 
|-id=336 bgcolor=#E9E9E9
| 452336 ||  || — || August 23, 2001 || Anderson Mesa || LONEOS || — || align=right | 1.6 km || 
|-id=337 bgcolor=#FA8072
| 452337 ||  || — || September 7, 2001 || Socorro || LINEAR || — || align=right data-sort-value="0.62" | 620 m || 
|-id=338 bgcolor=#E9E9E9
| 452338 ||  || — || September 12, 2001 || Socorro || LINEAR || — || align=right | 1.8 km || 
|-id=339 bgcolor=#E9E9E9
| 452339 ||  || — || September 11, 2001 || Socorro || LINEAR || — || align=right | 2.0 km || 
|-id=340 bgcolor=#fefefe
| 452340 ||  || — || August 24, 2001 || Socorro || LINEAR || — || align=right data-sort-value="0.84" | 840 m || 
|-id=341 bgcolor=#fefefe
| 452341 ||  || — || September 16, 2001 || Socorro || LINEAR || — || align=right data-sort-value="0.73" | 730 m || 
|-id=342 bgcolor=#E9E9E9
| 452342 ||  || — || September 17, 2001 || Socorro || LINEAR || — || align=right | 2.0 km || 
|-id=343 bgcolor=#E9E9E9
| 452343 ||  || — || September 19, 2001 || Socorro || LINEAR || — || align=right | 2.2 km || 
|-id=344 bgcolor=#fefefe
| 452344 ||  || — || September 19, 2001 || Socorro || LINEAR || — || align=right data-sort-value="0.78" | 780 m || 
|-id=345 bgcolor=#fefefe
| 452345 ||  || — || September 19, 2001 || Socorro || LINEAR || — || align=right data-sort-value="0.57" | 570 m || 
|-id=346 bgcolor=#E9E9E9
| 452346 ||  || — || September 22, 2001 || Kitt Peak || Spacewatch || — || align=right | 1.9 km || 
|-id=347 bgcolor=#E9E9E9
| 452347 ||  || — || September 21, 2001 || Anderson Mesa || LONEOS || — || align=right | 2.9 km || 
|-id=348 bgcolor=#E9E9E9
| 452348 ||  || — || October 14, 2001 || Needville || Needville Obs. || — || align=right | 2.0 km || 
|-id=349 bgcolor=#fefefe
| 452349 ||  || — || October 14, 2001 || Socorro || LINEAR || — || align=right | 1.1 km || 
|-id=350 bgcolor=#fefefe
| 452350 ||  || — || October 15, 2001 || Palomar || NEAT || — || align=right data-sort-value="0.75" | 750 m || 
|-id=351 bgcolor=#E9E9E9
| 452351 ||  || — || October 14, 2001 || Socorro || LINEAR || — || align=right | 2.9 km || 
|-id=352 bgcolor=#E9E9E9
| 452352 ||  || — || September 25, 2001 || Socorro || LINEAR || — || align=right | 1.7 km || 
|-id=353 bgcolor=#fefefe
| 452353 ||  || — || October 25, 2001 || Desert Eagle || W. K. Y. Yeung || — || align=right data-sort-value="0.77" | 770 m || 
|-id=354 bgcolor=#E9E9E9
| 452354 ||  || — || October 18, 2001 || Socorro || LINEAR || — || align=right | 2.0 km || 
|-id=355 bgcolor=#E9E9E9
| 452355 ||  || — || October 20, 2001 || Socorro || LINEAR || — || align=right | 2.2 km || 
|-id=356 bgcolor=#fefefe
| 452356 ||  || — || October 23, 2001 || Socorro || LINEAR || — || align=right data-sort-value="0.56" | 560 m || 
|-id=357 bgcolor=#fefefe
| 452357 ||  || — || October 18, 2001 || Palomar || NEAT || — || align=right data-sort-value="0.66" | 660 m || 
|-id=358 bgcolor=#fefefe
| 452358 ||  || — || September 20, 2001 || Kitt Peak || Spacewatch || — || align=right data-sort-value="0.72" | 720 m || 
|-id=359 bgcolor=#fefefe
| 452359 ||  || — || October 24, 2001 || Kitt Peak || Spacewatch || — || align=right data-sort-value="0.43" | 430 m || 
|-id=360 bgcolor=#fefefe
| 452360 ||  || — || September 20, 2001 || Socorro || LINEAR || — || align=right data-sort-value="0.91" | 910 m || 
|-id=361 bgcolor=#fefefe
| 452361 ||  || — || November 10, 2001 || Socorro || LINEAR || — || align=right data-sort-value="0.79" | 790 m || 
|-id=362 bgcolor=#FA8072
| 452362 ||  || — || November 15, 2001 || Socorro || LINEAR || — || align=right data-sort-value="0.58" | 580 m || 
|-id=363 bgcolor=#E9E9E9
| 452363 ||  || — || November 17, 2001 || Socorro || LINEAR || — || align=right | 1.9 km || 
|-id=364 bgcolor=#fefefe
| 452364 ||  || — || November 19, 2001 || Socorro || LINEAR || — || align=right data-sort-value="0.72" | 720 m || 
|-id=365 bgcolor=#fefefe
| 452365 ||  || — || November 20, 2001 || Kitt Peak || Spacewatch || — || align=right data-sort-value="0.72" | 720 m || 
|-id=366 bgcolor=#fefefe
| 452366 ||  || — || December 10, 2001 || Socorro || LINEAR || — || align=right data-sort-value="0.98" | 980 m || 
|-id=367 bgcolor=#fefefe
| 452367 ||  || — || December 14, 2001 || Socorro || LINEAR || — || align=right | 1.1 km || 
|-id=368 bgcolor=#fefefe
| 452368 ||  || — || November 11, 2001 || Socorro || LINEAR || H || align=right data-sort-value="0.83" | 830 m || 
|-id=369 bgcolor=#E9E9E9
| 452369 ||  || — || December 14, 2001 || Socorro || LINEAR || — || align=right | 3.7 km || 
|-id=370 bgcolor=#fefefe
| 452370 ||  || — || December 15, 2001 || Socorro || LINEAR || — || align=right data-sort-value="0.71" | 710 m || 
|-id=371 bgcolor=#fefefe
| 452371 ||  || — || December 14, 2001 || Socorro || LINEAR || — || align=right data-sort-value="0.77" | 770 m || 
|-id=372 bgcolor=#fefefe
| 452372 ||  || — || December 18, 2001 || Socorro || LINEAR || H || align=right data-sort-value="0.99" | 990 m || 
|-id=373 bgcolor=#E9E9E9
| 452373 ||  || — || December 17, 2001 || Socorro || LINEAR || — || align=right | 1.9 km || 
|-id=374 bgcolor=#fefefe
| 452374 ||  || — || December 18, 2001 || Socorro || LINEAR || — || align=right data-sort-value="0.82" | 820 m || 
|-id=375 bgcolor=#fefefe
| 452375 ||  || — || December 18, 2001 || Apache Point || SDSS || H || align=right data-sort-value="0.98" | 980 m || 
|-id=376 bgcolor=#FFC2E0
| 452376 ||  || — || January 8, 2002 || Socorro || LINEAR || APOPHAcritical || align=right data-sort-value="0.36" | 360 m || 
|-id=377 bgcolor=#fefefe
| 452377 ||  || — || January 9, 2002 || Socorro || LINEAR || — || align=right data-sort-value="0.95" | 950 m || 
|-id=378 bgcolor=#fefefe
| 452378 ||  || — || January 13, 2002 || Socorro || LINEAR || — || align=right data-sort-value="0.94" | 940 m || 
|-id=379 bgcolor=#fefefe
| 452379 ||  || — || February 4, 2002 || Haleakala || NEAT || — || align=right | 1.2 km || 
|-id=380 bgcolor=#d6d6d6
| 452380 ||  || — || February 6, 2002 || Socorro || LINEAR || — || align=right | 2.1 km || 
|-id=381 bgcolor=#fefefe
| 452381 ||  || — || February 7, 2002 || Socorro || LINEAR || — || align=right | 1.2 km || 
|-id=382 bgcolor=#fefefe
| 452382 ||  || — || January 14, 2002 || Socorro || LINEAR || — || align=right data-sort-value="0.84" | 840 m || 
|-id=383 bgcolor=#fefefe
| 452383 ||  || — || February 10, 2002 || Socorro || LINEAR || — || align=right | 2.1 km || 
|-id=384 bgcolor=#FA8072
| 452384 ||  || — || March 12, 2002 || Palomar || NEAT || — || align=right data-sort-value="0.55" | 550 m || 
|-id=385 bgcolor=#fefefe
| 452385 ||  || — || March 20, 2002 || Kitt Peak || Spacewatch || — || align=right | 1.2 km || 
|-id=386 bgcolor=#d6d6d6
| 452386 ||  || — || May 5, 2002 || Kitt Peak || Spacewatch || — || align=right | 3.6 km || 
|-id=387 bgcolor=#E9E9E9
| 452387 ||  || — || June 13, 2002 || Palomar || NEAT || (5) || align=right data-sort-value="0.93" | 930 m || 
|-id=388 bgcolor=#E9E9E9
| 452388 ||  || — || July 9, 2002 || Palomar || NEAT || — || align=right data-sort-value="0.98" | 980 m || 
|-id=389 bgcolor=#FFC2E0
| 452389 ||  || — || July 13, 2002 || Socorro || LINEAR || AMO +1km || align=right data-sort-value="0.85" | 850 m || 
|-id=390 bgcolor=#E9E9E9
| 452390 ||  || — || July 14, 2002 || Palomar || NEAT || — || align=right | 1.2 km || 
|-id=391 bgcolor=#FA8072
| 452391 ||  || — || July 8, 2002 || Palomar || NEAT || — || align=right data-sort-value="0.62" | 620 m || 
|-id=392 bgcolor=#d6d6d6
| 452392 ||  || — || August 7, 2002 || Palomar || NEAT || — || align=right | 4.4 km || 
|-id=393 bgcolor=#fefefe
| 452393 ||  || — || August 12, 2002 || Socorro || LINEAR || — || align=right data-sort-value="0.63" | 630 m || 
|-id=394 bgcolor=#E9E9E9
| 452394 ||  || — || August 14, 2002 || Socorro || LINEAR || — || align=right data-sort-value="0.82" | 820 m || 
|-id=395 bgcolor=#E9E9E9
| 452395 ||  || — || August 12, 2002 || Socorro || LINEAR || RAF || align=right data-sort-value="0.97" | 970 m || 
|-id=396 bgcolor=#E9E9E9
| 452396 ||  || — || August 8, 2002 || Palomar || NEAT || — || align=right | 1.4 km || 
|-id=397 bgcolor=#FFC2E0
| 452397 ||  || — || August 14, 2002 || Palomar || NEAT || AMO || align=right data-sort-value="0.34" | 340 m || 
|-id=398 bgcolor=#E9E9E9
| 452398 ||  || — || August 8, 2002 || Palomar || S. F. Hönig || — || align=right | 1.0 km || 
|-id=399 bgcolor=#E9E9E9
| 452399 ||  || — || August 7, 2002 || Palomar || NEAT || (5) || align=right | 1.2 km || 
|-id=400 bgcolor=#fefefe
| 452400 ||  || — || August 16, 2002 || Palomar || NEAT || H || align=right data-sort-value="0.57" | 570 m || 
|}

452401–452500 

|-bgcolor=#E9E9E9
| 452401 ||  || — || October 28, 1994 || Kitt Peak || Spacewatch || (5) || align=right data-sort-value="0.74" | 740 m || 
|-id=402 bgcolor=#E9E9E9
| 452402 ||  || — || September 5, 2002 || Socorro || LINEAR || — || align=right | 1.6 km || 
|-id=403 bgcolor=#E9E9E9
| 452403 ||  || — || September 12, 2002 || Palomar || NEAT || — || align=right | 1.2 km || 
|-id=404 bgcolor=#E9E9E9
| 452404 ||  || — || September 11, 2002 || Palomar || NEAT || — || align=right | 1.4 km || 
|-id=405 bgcolor=#E9E9E9
| 452405 ||  || — || September 7, 2002 || Socorro || LINEAR || — || align=right | 1.3 km || 
|-id=406 bgcolor=#E9E9E9
| 452406 ||  || — || September 15, 2002 || Palomar || NEAT || — || align=right | 1.0 km || 
|-id=407 bgcolor=#FA8072
| 452407 ||  || — || September 23, 2002 || Palomar || NEAT || — || align=right | 2.2 km || 
|-id=408 bgcolor=#E9E9E9
| 452408 ||  || — || September 16, 2002 || Palomar || NEAT || (5) || align=right data-sort-value="0.94" | 940 m || 
|-id=409 bgcolor=#E9E9E9
| 452409 ||  || — || September 26, 2002 || Palomar || NEAT || — || align=right data-sort-value="0.86" | 860 m || 
|-id=410 bgcolor=#E9E9E9
| 452410 ||  || — || September 16, 2002 || Palomar || NEAT || — || align=right data-sort-value="0.94" | 940 m || 
|-id=411 bgcolor=#E9E9E9
| 452411 ||  || — || October 1, 2002 || Anderson Mesa || LONEOS || — || align=right | 1.5 km || 
|-id=412 bgcolor=#E9E9E9
| 452412 ||  || — || October 3, 2002 || Palomar || NEAT || — || align=right | 1.8 km || 
|-id=413 bgcolor=#E9E9E9
| 452413 ||  || — || October 2, 2002 || Socorro || LINEAR || — || align=right | 1.0 km || 
|-id=414 bgcolor=#E9E9E9
| 452414 ||  || — || October 4, 2002 || Socorro || LINEAR || (5) || align=right data-sort-value="0.86" | 860 m || 
|-id=415 bgcolor=#FA8072
| 452415 ||  || — || October 3, 2002 || Socorro || LINEAR || — || align=right data-sort-value="0.62" | 620 m || 
|-id=416 bgcolor=#E9E9E9
| 452416 ||  || — || October 25, 2002 || Palomar || NEAT || — || align=right | 1.8 km || 
|-id=417 bgcolor=#E9E9E9
| 452417 ||  || — || October 31, 2002 || Socorro || LINEAR || (1547) || align=right | 1.5 km || 
|-id=418 bgcolor=#E9E9E9
| 452418 ||  || — || November 5, 2002 || Socorro || LINEAR || (1547) || align=right | 1.3 km || 
|-id=419 bgcolor=#FA8072
| 452419 ||  || — || November 11, 2002 || Socorro || LINEAR || — || align=right | 3.5 km || 
|-id=420 bgcolor=#E9E9E9
| 452420 ||  || — || November 6, 2002 || Anderson Mesa || LONEOS || — || align=right | 1.9 km || 
|-id=421 bgcolor=#FFC2E0
| 452421 ||  || — || November 13, 2002 || Palomar || NEAT || AMO || align=right data-sort-value="0.74" | 740 m || 
|-id=422 bgcolor=#E9E9E9
| 452422 ||  || — || November 13, 2002 || Palomar || NEAT || EUN || align=right | 1.4 km || 
|-id=423 bgcolor=#E9E9E9
| 452423 ||  || — || November 4, 2002 || Palomar || NEAT || — || align=right | 1.4 km || 
|-id=424 bgcolor=#E9E9E9
| 452424 ||  || — || November 21, 2002 || Palomar || NEAT || — || align=right | 1.6 km || 
|-id=425 bgcolor=#E9E9E9
| 452425 ||  || — || December 10, 2002 || Socorro || LINEAR || JUN || align=right | 1.2 km || 
|-id=426 bgcolor=#fefefe
| 452426 ||  || — || December 14, 2002 || Socorro || LINEAR || H || align=right data-sort-value="0.86" | 860 m || 
|-id=427 bgcolor=#E9E9E9
| 452427 ||  || — || January 5, 2003 || Socorro || LINEAR || — || align=right | 1.4 km || 
|-id=428 bgcolor=#E9E9E9
| 452428 ||  || — || January 25, 2003 || Palomar || NEAT || — || align=right | 1.6 km || 
|-id=429 bgcolor=#E9E9E9
| 452429 ||  || — || January 27, 2003 || Anderson Mesa || LONEOS || — || align=right | 2.4 km || 
|-id=430 bgcolor=#fefefe
| 452430 ||  || — || January 28, 2003 || Socorro || LINEAR || H || align=right data-sort-value="0.94" | 940 m || 
|-id=431 bgcolor=#E9E9E9
| 452431 ||  || — || February 1, 2003 || Haleakala || NEAT || — || align=right | 1.4 km || 
|-id=432 bgcolor=#E9E9E9
| 452432 ||  || — || March 6, 2003 || Palomar || NEAT || — || align=right | 2.4 km || 
|-id=433 bgcolor=#fefefe
| 452433 ||  || — || March 26, 2003 || Kitt Peak || Spacewatch || — || align=right data-sort-value="0.77" | 770 m || 
|-id=434 bgcolor=#fefefe
| 452434 ||  || — || March 24, 2003 || Kitt Peak || Spacewatch || — || align=right data-sort-value="0.82" | 820 m || 
|-id=435 bgcolor=#FA8072
| 452435 ||  || — || March 11, 2003 || Socorro || LINEAR || Tj (2.88) || align=right | 2.7 km || 
|-id=436 bgcolor=#fefefe
| 452436 ||  || — || April 24, 2003 || Kitt Peak || Spacewatch || — || align=right data-sort-value="0.81" | 810 m || 
|-id=437 bgcolor=#d6d6d6
| 452437 ||  || — || May 27, 2003 || Kitt Peak || Spacewatch || — || align=right | 4.3 km || 
|-id=438 bgcolor=#d6d6d6
| 452438 ||  || — || August 20, 2003 || Socorro || LINEAR || Tj (2.99) || align=right | 5.0 km || 
|-id=439 bgcolor=#fefefe
| 452439 ||  || — || August 25, 2003 || Socorro || LINEAR || — || align=right data-sort-value="0.85" | 850 m || 
|-id=440 bgcolor=#fefefe
| 452440 ||  || — || August 24, 2003 || Socorro || LINEAR || — || align=right | 1.1 km || 
|-id=441 bgcolor=#d6d6d6
| 452441 ||  || — || August 21, 2003 || Socorro || LINEAR || — || align=right | 4.1 km || 
|-id=442 bgcolor=#d6d6d6
| 452442 ||  || — || September 18, 2003 || Palomar || NEAT || — || align=right | 3.8 km || 
|-id=443 bgcolor=#fefefe
| 452443 ||  || — || September 18, 2003 || Kitt Peak || Spacewatch || critical || align=right data-sort-value="0.52" | 520 m || 
|-id=444 bgcolor=#d6d6d6
| 452444 ||  || — || September 20, 2003 || Socorro || LINEAR || Tj (2.93) || align=right | 3.0 km || 
|-id=445 bgcolor=#d6d6d6
| 452445 ||  || — || September 16, 2003 || Kitt Peak || Spacewatch || — || align=right | 2.4 km || 
|-id=446 bgcolor=#fefefe
| 452446 ||  || — || September 16, 2003 || Palomar || NEAT || — || align=right | 1.4 km || 
|-id=447 bgcolor=#fefefe
| 452447 ||  || — || September 22, 2003 || Anderson Mesa || LONEOS || — || align=right data-sort-value="0.78" | 780 m || 
|-id=448 bgcolor=#fefefe
| 452448 ||  || — || September 23, 2003 || Palomar || NEAT || critical || align=right data-sort-value="0.94" | 940 m || 
|-id=449 bgcolor=#d6d6d6
| 452449 ||  || — || September 26, 2003 || Socorro || LINEAR || THB || align=right | 2.9 km || 
|-id=450 bgcolor=#fefefe
| 452450 ||  || — || September 25, 2003 || Palomar || NEAT || — || align=right data-sort-value="0.94" | 940 m || 
|-id=451 bgcolor=#fefefe
| 452451 ||  || — || September 17, 2003 || Palomar || NEAT || — || align=right | 1.1 km || 
|-id=452 bgcolor=#d6d6d6
| 452452 ||  || — || September 27, 2003 || Kitt Peak || Spacewatch || — || align=right | 4.0 km || 
|-id=453 bgcolor=#fefefe
| 452453 ||  || — || September 26, 2003 || Apache Point || SDSS || NYScritical || align=right data-sort-value="0.52" | 520 m || 
|-id=454 bgcolor=#d6d6d6
| 452454 ||  || — || September 16, 2003 || Kitt Peak || Spacewatch || HYG || align=right | 2.4 km || 
|-id=455 bgcolor=#d6d6d6
| 452455 ||  || — || September 19, 2003 || Campo Imperatore || CINEOS || — || align=right | 2.4 km || 
|-id=456 bgcolor=#d6d6d6
| 452456 ||  || — || September 26, 2003 || Apache Point || SDSS || — || align=right | 2.5 km || 
|-id=457 bgcolor=#d6d6d6
| 452457 ||  || — || September 18, 2003 || Kitt Peak || Spacewatch || VER || align=right | 2.3 km || 
|-id=458 bgcolor=#fefefe
| 452458 ||  || — || October 4, 2003 || Kingsnake || J. V. McClusky || — || align=right | 1.3 km || 
|-id=459 bgcolor=#d6d6d6
| 452459 ||  || — || October 16, 2003 || Kitt Peak || Spacewatch || — || align=right | 3.1 km || 
|-id=460 bgcolor=#fefefe
| 452460 ||  || — || October 18, 2003 || Kitt Peak || Spacewatch || — || align=right data-sort-value="0.89" | 890 m || 
|-id=461 bgcolor=#d6d6d6
| 452461 ||  || — || October 21, 2003 || Kitt Peak || Spacewatch || — || align=right | 3.0 km || 
|-id=462 bgcolor=#d6d6d6
| 452462 ||  || — || October 24, 2003 || Kitt Peak || Spacewatch || — || align=right | 3.0 km || 
|-id=463 bgcolor=#E9E9E9
| 452463 ||  || — || October 1, 2003 || Kitt Peak || Spacewatch || MAR || align=right data-sort-value="0.91" | 910 m || 
|-id=464 bgcolor=#fefefe
| 452464 ||  || — || October 22, 2003 || Apache Point || SDSS || — || align=right data-sort-value="0.59" | 590 m || 
|-id=465 bgcolor=#d6d6d6
| 452465 ||  || — || November 15, 2003 || Kitt Peak || Spacewatch || — || align=right | 3.2 km || 
|-id=466 bgcolor=#d6d6d6
| 452466 ||  || — || November 18, 2003 || Palomar || NEAT || — || align=right | 3.8 km || 
|-id=467 bgcolor=#E9E9E9
| 452467 ||  || — || November 18, 2003 || Palomar || NEAT || — || align=right data-sort-value="0.99" | 990 m || 
|-id=468 bgcolor=#d6d6d6
| 452468 ||  || — || September 28, 2003 || Desert Eagle || W. K. Y. Yeung || — || align=right | 3.8 km || 
|-id=469 bgcolor=#E9E9E9
| 452469 ||  || — || December 19, 2003 || Kitt Peak || Spacewatch || — || align=right | 1.5 km || 
|-id=470 bgcolor=#E9E9E9
| 452470 ||  || — || December 19, 2003 || Kitt Peak || Spacewatch || — || align=right | 1.3 km || 
|-id=471 bgcolor=#E9E9E9
| 452471 ||  || — || December 18, 2003 || Palomar || NEAT || — || align=right | 1.1 km || 
|-id=472 bgcolor=#E9E9E9
| 452472 ||  || — || January 15, 2004 || Kitt Peak || Spacewatch || — || align=right data-sort-value="0.82" | 820 m || 
|-id=473 bgcolor=#E9E9E9
| 452473 ||  || — || January 17, 2004 || Haleakala || NEAT || — || align=right | 1.3 km || 
|-id=474 bgcolor=#FFC2E0
| 452474 ||  || — || January 18, 2004 || Catalina || CSS || APOcritical || align=right data-sort-value="0.68" | 680 m || 
|-id=475 bgcolor=#E9E9E9
| 452475 ||  || — || January 18, 2004 || Palomar || NEAT || — || align=right | 2.2 km || 
|-id=476 bgcolor=#E9E9E9
| 452476 ||  || — || January 27, 2004 || Kitt Peak || Spacewatch || — || align=right data-sort-value="0.75" | 750 m || 
|-id=477 bgcolor=#E9E9E9
| 452477 ||  || — || January 25, 2004 || Haleakala || NEAT || — || align=right | 1.6 km || 
|-id=478 bgcolor=#E9E9E9
| 452478 ||  || — || January 30, 2004 || Socorro || LINEAR || EUN || align=right | 1.3 km || 
|-id=479 bgcolor=#E9E9E9
| 452479 ||  || — || January 22, 2004 || Socorro || LINEAR || — || align=right | 1.0 km || 
|-id=480 bgcolor=#E9E9E9
| 452480 ||  || — || February 2, 2004 || Socorro || LINEAR || — || align=right | 2.9 km || 
|-id=481 bgcolor=#E9E9E9
| 452481 ||  || — || February 14, 2004 || Socorro || LINEAR || — || align=right | 1.2 km || 
|-id=482 bgcolor=#E9E9E9
| 452482 ||  || — || February 12, 2004 || Palomar || NEAT || — || align=right data-sort-value="0.93" | 930 m || 
|-id=483 bgcolor=#E9E9E9
| 452483 ||  || — || January 24, 2004 || Socorro || LINEAR || — || align=right | 1.9 km || 
|-id=484 bgcolor=#E9E9E9
| 452484 ||  || — || February 19, 2004 || Socorro || LINEAR || — || align=right | 1.4 km || 
|-id=485 bgcolor=#E9E9E9
| 452485 ||  || — || February 29, 2004 || Kitt Peak || Spacewatch || — || align=right | 2.4 km || 
|-id=486 bgcolor=#E9E9E9
| 452486 ||  || — || March 15, 2004 || Kitt Peak || Spacewatch || — || align=right | 1.2 km || 
|-id=487 bgcolor=#E9E9E9
| 452487 ||  || — || March 17, 2004 || Mount Graham || W. H. Ryan, C. T. Martinez || — || align=right | 2.0 km || 
|-id=488 bgcolor=#E9E9E9
| 452488 ||  || — || March 17, 2004 || Socorro || LINEAR || — || align=right | 1.7 km || 
|-id=489 bgcolor=#E9E9E9
| 452489 ||  || — || March 17, 2004 || Socorro || LINEAR || — || align=right | 1.6 km || 
|-id=490 bgcolor=#E9E9E9
| 452490 ||  || — || March 27, 2004 || Socorro || LINEAR || — || align=right | 1.3 km || 
|-id=491 bgcolor=#E9E9E9
| 452491 ||  || — || March 22, 2004 || Anderson Mesa || LONEOS || — || align=right | 1.9 km || 
|-id=492 bgcolor=#E9E9E9
| 452492 ||  || — || April 12, 2004 || Anderson Mesa || LONEOS || — || align=right | 2.2 km || 
|-id=493 bgcolor=#fefefe
| 452493 ||  || — || April 13, 2004 || Kitt Peak || Spacewatch || — || align=right data-sort-value="0.53" | 530 m || 
|-id=494 bgcolor=#E9E9E9
| 452494 ||  || — || April 21, 2004 || Kitt Peak || Spacewatch || — || align=right | 1.7 km || 
|-id=495 bgcolor=#fefefe
| 452495 ||  || — || July 16, 2004 || Campo Imperatore || CINEOS || — || align=right data-sort-value="0.95" | 950 m || 
|-id=496 bgcolor=#fefefe
| 452496 ||  || — || August 8, 2004 || Anderson Mesa || LONEOS || — || align=right data-sort-value="0.65" | 650 m || 
|-id=497 bgcolor=#d6d6d6
| 452497 ||  || — || August 10, 2004 || Socorro || LINEAR || — || align=right | 2.8 km || 
|-id=498 bgcolor=#d6d6d6
| 452498 ||  || — || August 19, 2004 || Socorro || LINEAR || — || align=right | 3.8 km || 
|-id=499 bgcolor=#fefefe
| 452499 ||  || — || August 21, 2004 || Siding Spring || SSS || — || align=right data-sort-value="0.90" | 900 m || 
|-id=500 bgcolor=#fefefe
| 452500 ||  || — || September 7, 2004 || Socorro || LINEAR || H || align=right data-sort-value="0.86" | 860 m || 
|}

452501–452600 

|-bgcolor=#fefefe
| 452501 ||  || — || August 10, 2004 || Socorro || LINEAR || — || align=right data-sort-value="0.71" | 710 m || 
|-id=502 bgcolor=#fefefe
| 452502 ||  || — || September 8, 2004 || Socorro || LINEAR || — || align=right data-sort-value="0.83" | 830 m || 
|-id=503 bgcolor=#fefefe
| 452503 ||  || — || August 17, 2004 || Socorro || LINEAR || H || align=right data-sort-value="0.77" | 770 m || 
|-id=504 bgcolor=#d6d6d6
| 452504 ||  || — || September 8, 2004 || Socorro || LINEAR || critical || align=right | 1.9 km || 
|-id=505 bgcolor=#fefefe
| 452505 ||  || — || August 23, 2004 || Kitt Peak || Spacewatch || (2076) || align=right data-sort-value="0.96" | 960 m || 
|-id=506 bgcolor=#fefefe
| 452506 ||  || — || August 22, 2004 || Kitt Peak || Spacewatch || — || align=right data-sort-value="0.78" | 780 m || 
|-id=507 bgcolor=#E9E9E9
| 452507 ||  || — || August 11, 2004 || Socorro || LINEAR || — || align=right | 2.9 km || 
|-id=508 bgcolor=#fefefe
| 452508 ||  || — || August 22, 2004 || Kitt Peak || Spacewatch || — || align=right data-sort-value="0.85" | 850 m || 
|-id=509 bgcolor=#d6d6d6
| 452509 ||  || — || September 10, 2004 || Socorro || LINEAR || — || align=right | 2.9 km || 
|-id=510 bgcolor=#fefefe
| 452510 ||  || — || September 11, 2004 || Kitt Peak || Spacewatch || — || align=right data-sort-value="0.75" | 750 m || 
|-id=511 bgcolor=#d6d6d6
| 452511 ||  || — || September 14, 2004 || Socorro || LINEAR || — || align=right | 3.3 km || 
|-id=512 bgcolor=#d6d6d6
| 452512 ||  || — || September 10, 2004 || Kitt Peak || Spacewatch || — || align=right | 2.0 km || 
|-id=513 bgcolor=#fefefe
| 452513 ||  || — || September 11, 2004 || Kitt Peak || Spacewatch || — || align=right data-sort-value="0.53" | 530 m || 
|-id=514 bgcolor=#d6d6d6
| 452514 ||  || — || September 10, 2004 || Socorro || LINEAR || — || align=right | 3.0 km || 
|-id=515 bgcolor=#d6d6d6
| 452515 ||  || — || September 11, 2004 || Kitt Peak || Spacewatch || — || align=right | 2.2 km || 
|-id=516 bgcolor=#fefefe
| 452516 ||  || — || September 13, 2004 || Socorro || LINEAR || — || align=right data-sort-value="0.71" | 710 m || 
|-id=517 bgcolor=#fefefe
| 452517 ||  || — || September 15, 2004 || Kitt Peak || Spacewatch || — || align=right data-sort-value="0.60" | 600 m || 
|-id=518 bgcolor=#d6d6d6
| 452518 ||  || — || September 7, 2004 || Kitt Peak || Spacewatch || — || align=right | 2.2 km || 
|-id=519 bgcolor=#fefefe
| 452519 ||  || — || September 10, 2004 || Socorro || LINEAR || — || align=right data-sort-value="0.73" | 730 m || 
|-id=520 bgcolor=#d6d6d6
| 452520 ||  || — || October 4, 2004 || Kitt Peak || Spacewatch || — || align=right | 2.0 km || 
|-id=521 bgcolor=#d6d6d6
| 452521 ||  || — || October 9, 2004 || Socorro || LINEAR || — || align=right | 2.9 km || 
|-id=522 bgcolor=#fefefe
| 452522 ||  || — || October 4, 2004 || Kitt Peak || Spacewatch || — || align=right data-sort-value="0.78" | 780 m || 
|-id=523 bgcolor=#d6d6d6
| 452523 ||  || — || October 4, 2004 || Kitt Peak || Spacewatch || — || align=right | 3.1 km || 
|-id=524 bgcolor=#fefefe
| 452524 ||  || — || October 5, 2004 || Kitt Peak || Spacewatch || — || align=right data-sort-value="0.79" | 790 m || 
|-id=525 bgcolor=#fefefe
| 452525 ||  || — || October 6, 2004 || Kitt Peak || Spacewatch || — || align=right data-sort-value="0.73" | 730 m || 
|-id=526 bgcolor=#d6d6d6
| 452526 ||  || — || October 7, 2004 || Kitt Peak || Spacewatch || EOS || align=right | 1.9 km || 
|-id=527 bgcolor=#d6d6d6
| 452527 ||  || — || October 7, 2004 || Kitt Peak || Spacewatch || — || align=right | 2.9 km || 
|-id=528 bgcolor=#fefefe
| 452528 ||  || — || October 5, 2004 || Kitt Peak || Spacewatch || — || align=right data-sort-value="0.60" | 600 m || 
|-id=529 bgcolor=#fefefe
| 452529 ||  || — || September 17, 2004 || Kitt Peak || Spacewatch || critical || align=right data-sort-value="0.65" | 650 m || 
|-id=530 bgcolor=#d6d6d6
| 452530 ||  || — || October 5, 2004 || Kitt Peak || Spacewatch || EOS || align=right | 1.6 km || 
|-id=531 bgcolor=#fefefe
| 452531 ||  || — || October 4, 2004 || Kitt Peak || Spacewatch || — || align=right data-sort-value="0.68" | 680 m || 
|-id=532 bgcolor=#d6d6d6
| 452532 ||  || — || October 6, 2004 || Kitt Peak || Spacewatch || — || align=right | 1.9 km || 
|-id=533 bgcolor=#d6d6d6
| 452533 ||  || — || October 6, 2004 || Kitt Peak || Spacewatch || HYG || align=right | 3.2 km || 
|-id=534 bgcolor=#d6d6d6
| 452534 ||  || — || October 9, 2004 || Socorro || LINEAR || — || align=right | 2.4 km || 
|-id=535 bgcolor=#d6d6d6
| 452535 ||  || — || October 7, 2004 || Kitt Peak || Spacewatch || — || align=right | 2.6 km || 
|-id=536 bgcolor=#fefefe
| 452536 ||  || — || October 8, 2004 || Kitt Peak || Spacewatch || NYS || align=right data-sort-value="0.48" | 480 m || 
|-id=537 bgcolor=#fefefe
| 452537 ||  || — || October 10, 2004 || Kitt Peak || Spacewatch || — || align=right data-sort-value="0.62" | 620 m || 
|-id=538 bgcolor=#d6d6d6
| 452538 ||  || — || October 9, 2004 || Kitt Peak || Spacewatch || — || align=right | 2.0 km || 
|-id=539 bgcolor=#d6d6d6
| 452539 ||  || — || October 9, 2004 || Kitt Peak || Spacewatch || — || align=right | 2.9 km || 
|-id=540 bgcolor=#fefefe
| 452540 ||  || — || October 9, 2004 || Kitt Peak || Spacewatch || — || align=right data-sort-value="0.86" | 860 m || 
|-id=541 bgcolor=#d6d6d6
| 452541 ||  || — || October 10, 2004 || Kitt Peak || Spacewatch || — || align=right | 2.9 km || 
|-id=542 bgcolor=#fefefe
| 452542 ||  || — || October 13, 2004 || Kitt Peak || Spacewatch || — || align=right data-sort-value="0.54" | 540 m || 
|-id=543 bgcolor=#fefefe
| 452543 ||  || — || October 14, 2004 || Kitt Peak || Spacewatch || — || align=right data-sort-value="0.64" | 640 m || 
|-id=544 bgcolor=#fefefe
| 452544 ||  || — || October 16, 2004 || Socorro || LINEAR || H || align=right | 1.0 km || 
|-id=545 bgcolor=#d6d6d6
| 452545 ||  || — || November 4, 2004 || Socorro || LINEAR || — || align=right | 4.5 km || 
|-id=546 bgcolor=#fefefe
| 452546 ||  || — || October 24, 2004 || Kitt Peak || Spacewatch || — || align=right | 1.0 km || 
|-id=547 bgcolor=#fefefe
| 452547 ||  || — || November 4, 2004 || Kitt Peak || Spacewatch || — || align=right data-sort-value="0.57" | 570 m || 
|-id=548 bgcolor=#fefefe
| 452548 ||  || — || October 9, 2004 || Kitt Peak || Spacewatch || — || align=right data-sort-value="0.83" | 830 m || 
|-id=549 bgcolor=#fefefe
| 452549 ||  || — || November 3, 2004 || Anderson Mesa || LONEOS || H || align=right data-sort-value="0.80" | 800 m || 
|-id=550 bgcolor=#d6d6d6
| 452550 ||  || — || November 19, 2004 || Socorro || LINEAR || — || align=right | 3.6 km || 
|-id=551 bgcolor=#d6d6d6
| 452551 ||  || — || December 10, 2004 || Socorro || LINEAR || — || align=right | 2.0 km || 
|-id=552 bgcolor=#d6d6d6
| 452552 ||  || — || December 3, 2004 || Kitt Peak || Spacewatch || LIX || align=right | 3.3 km || 
|-id=553 bgcolor=#fefefe
| 452553 ||  || — || December 10, 2004 || Socorro || LINEAR || — || align=right | 1.0 km || 
|-id=554 bgcolor=#fefefe
| 452554 ||  || — || November 10, 2004 || Kitt Peak || Spacewatch || — || align=right data-sort-value="0.94" | 940 m || 
|-id=555 bgcolor=#fefefe
| 452555 ||  || — || December 14, 2004 || Socorro || LINEAR || NYS || align=right data-sort-value="0.72" | 720 m || 
|-id=556 bgcolor=#d6d6d6
| 452556 ||  || — || December 14, 2004 || Socorro || LINEAR || — || align=right | 4.8 km || 
|-id=557 bgcolor=#fefefe
| 452557 ||  || — || December 16, 2004 || Socorro || LINEAR || — || align=right | 1.4 km || 
|-id=558 bgcolor=#fefefe
| 452558 ||  || — || December 18, 2004 || Mount Lemmon || Mount Lemmon Survey || MAS || align=right data-sort-value="0.59" | 590 m || 
|-id=559 bgcolor=#fefefe
| 452559 ||  || — || December 19, 2004 || Mount Lemmon || Mount Lemmon Survey || — || align=right data-sort-value="0.65" | 650 m || 
|-id=560 bgcolor=#d6d6d6
| 452560 ||  || — || December 16, 2004 || Kitt Peak || Spacewatch || — || align=right | 3.2 km || 
|-id=561 bgcolor=#FFC2E0
| 452561 ||  || — || January 1, 2005 || Catalina || CSS || AMO +1kmmoon || align=right | 1.1 km || 
|-id=562 bgcolor=#fefefe
| 452562 ||  || — || January 7, 2005 || Catalina || CSS || — || align=right | 1.2 km || 
|-id=563 bgcolor=#d6d6d6
| 452563 ||  || — || January 11, 2005 || Socorro || LINEAR || Tj (2.96) || align=right | 4.6 km || 
|-id=564 bgcolor=#d6d6d6
| 452564 ||  || — || January 13, 2005 || Kitt Peak || Spacewatch || — || align=right | 4.9 km || 
|-id=565 bgcolor=#fefefe
| 452565 ||  || — || January 13, 2005 || Kitt Peak || Spacewatch || NYS || align=right data-sort-value="0.52" | 520 m || 
|-id=566 bgcolor=#d6d6d6
| 452566 ||  || — || January 13, 2005 || Catalina || CSS || — || align=right | 3.9 km || 
|-id=567 bgcolor=#d6d6d6
| 452567 ||  || — || December 19, 2004 || Mount Lemmon || Mount Lemmon Survey || — || align=right | 2.6 km || 
|-id=568 bgcolor=#fefefe
| 452568 ||  || — || January 16, 2005 || Kitt Peak || Spacewatch || — || align=right data-sort-value="0.54" | 540 m || 
|-id=569 bgcolor=#fefefe
| 452569 ||  || — || January 16, 2005 || Mauna Kea || C. Veillet || — || align=right data-sort-value="0.93" | 930 m || 
|-id=570 bgcolor=#d6d6d6
| 452570 ||  || — || January 7, 2005 || Catalina || CSS || TIR || align=right | 3.4 km || 
|-id=571 bgcolor=#d6d6d6
| 452571 ||  || — || February 2, 2005 || Catalina || CSS || — || align=right | 3.3 km || 
|-id=572 bgcolor=#d6d6d6
| 452572 ||  || — || February 1, 2005 || Kitt Peak || Spacewatch || — || align=right | 3.2 km || 
|-id=573 bgcolor=#fefefe
| 452573 ||  || — || February 28, 2005 || Socorro || LINEAR || — || align=right | 1.3 km || 
|-id=574 bgcolor=#d6d6d6
| 452574 ||  || — || March 4, 2005 || Socorro || LINEAR || — || align=right | 3.8 km || 
|-id=575 bgcolor=#d6d6d6
| 452575 ||  || — || March 4, 2005 || Socorro || LINEAR || — || align=right | 3.8 km || 
|-id=576 bgcolor=#E9E9E9
| 452576 ||  || — || March 10, 2005 || Mount Lemmon || Mount Lemmon Survey || — || align=right | 1.2 km || 
|-id=577 bgcolor=#d6d6d6
| 452577 ||  || — || March 10, 2005 || Siding Spring || SSS || Tj (2.99) || align=right | 3.3 km || 
|-id=578 bgcolor=#d6d6d6
| 452578 ||  || — || January 18, 1999 || Kitt Peak || Spacewatch || — || align=right | 3.6 km || 
|-id=579 bgcolor=#fefefe
| 452579 ||  || — || March 8, 2005 || Catalina || CSS || — || align=right data-sort-value="0.87" | 870 m || 
|-id=580 bgcolor=#E9E9E9
| 452580 ||  || — || April 5, 2005 || Mount Lemmon || Mount Lemmon Survey || — || align=right data-sort-value="0.76" | 760 m || 
|-id=581 bgcolor=#E9E9E9
| 452581 ||  || — || March 10, 2005 || Catalina || CSS || — || align=right | 1.8 km || 
|-id=582 bgcolor=#E9E9E9
| 452582 ||  || — || April 7, 2005 || Kitt Peak || Spacewatch || — || align=right | 1.0 km || 
|-id=583 bgcolor=#E9E9E9
| 452583 ||  || — || May 3, 2005 || Kitt Peak || Spacewatch || ADE || align=right | 3.3 km || 
|-id=584 bgcolor=#E9E9E9
| 452584 ||  || — || April 14, 2005 || Kitt Peak || Spacewatch || — || align=right | 1.1 km || 
|-id=585 bgcolor=#E9E9E9
| 452585 ||  || — || May 8, 2005 || Kitt Peak || Spacewatch || — || align=right | 1.0 km || 
|-id=586 bgcolor=#E9E9E9
| 452586 ||  || — || May 7, 2005 || Kitt Peak || Spacewatch || EUN || align=right | 1.2 km || 
|-id=587 bgcolor=#E9E9E9
| 452587 ||  || — || May 10, 2005 || Mount Lemmon || Mount Lemmon Survey || EUN || align=right | 1.2 km || 
|-id=588 bgcolor=#E9E9E9
| 452588 ||  || — || May 8, 2005 || Mount Lemmon || Mount Lemmon Survey || — || align=right | 1.2 km || 
|-id=589 bgcolor=#E9E9E9
| 452589 ||  || — || May 9, 2005 || Kitt Peak || Spacewatch || — || align=right | 1.6 km || 
|-id=590 bgcolor=#E9E9E9
| 452590 ||  || — || May 10, 2005 || Kitt Peak || Spacewatch || — || align=right data-sort-value="0.87" | 870 m || 
|-id=591 bgcolor=#E9E9E9
| 452591 ||  || — || May 14, 2005 || Mount Lemmon || Mount Lemmon Survey || — || align=right | 2.1 km || 
|-id=592 bgcolor=#FA8072
| 452592 ||  || — || May 11, 2005 || Kitt Peak || Spacewatch || — || align=right data-sort-value="0.65" | 650 m || 
|-id=593 bgcolor=#E9E9E9
| 452593 ||  || — || June 1, 2005 || Mount Lemmon || Mount Lemmon Survey || EUN || align=right data-sort-value="0.83" | 830 m || 
|-id=594 bgcolor=#E9E9E9
| 452594 ||  || — || June 3, 2005 || Kitt Peak || Spacewatch || EUN || align=right | 1.1 km || 
|-id=595 bgcolor=#E9E9E9
| 452595 ||  || — || June 1, 2005 || Mount Lemmon || Mount Lemmon Survey || — || align=right | 1.3 km || 
|-id=596 bgcolor=#E9E9E9
| 452596 ||  || — || June 3, 2005 || Kitt Peak || Spacewatch || — || align=right | 1.1 km || 
|-id=597 bgcolor=#E9E9E9
| 452597 ||  || — || June 4, 2005 || Kitt Peak || Spacewatch || — || align=right | 1.4 km || 
|-id=598 bgcolor=#E9E9E9
| 452598 ||  || — || June 10, 2005 || Kitt Peak || Spacewatch || — || align=right | 2.4 km || 
|-id=599 bgcolor=#E9E9E9
| 452599 ||  || — || June 27, 2005 || Kitt Peak || Spacewatch || — || align=right | 2.3 km || 
|-id=600 bgcolor=#E9E9E9
| 452600 ||  || — || June 30, 2005 || Catalina || CSS || — || align=right | 2.1 km || 
|}

452601–452700 

|-bgcolor=#E9E9E9
| 452601 ||  || — || November 11, 2001 || Kitt Peak || Spacewatch || — || align=right | 2.0 km || 
|-id=602 bgcolor=#E9E9E9
| 452602 ||  || — || July 3, 2005 || Mount Lemmon || Mount Lemmon Survey || — || align=right | 2.1 km || 
|-id=603 bgcolor=#E9E9E9
| 452603 ||  || — || July 4, 2005 || Mount Lemmon || Mount Lemmon Survey || — || align=right | 1.8 km || 
|-id=604 bgcolor=#E9E9E9
| 452604 ||  || — || July 5, 2005 || Kitt Peak || Spacewatch || — || align=right | 1.8 km || 
|-id=605 bgcolor=#E9E9E9
| 452605 ||  || — || July 12, 2005 || Mount Lemmon || Mount Lemmon Survey || — || align=right | 2.4 km || 
|-id=606 bgcolor=#d6d6d6
| 452606 ||  || — || June 15, 2005 || Mount Lemmon || Mount Lemmon Survey || BRA || align=right | 1.2 km || 
|-id=607 bgcolor=#E9E9E9
| 452607 ||  || — || July 26, 2005 || Palomar || NEAT || — || align=right | 3.1 km || 
|-id=608 bgcolor=#fefefe
| 452608 ||  || — || June 17, 2005 || Mount Lemmon || Mount Lemmon Survey || — || align=right data-sort-value="0.64" | 640 m || 
|-id=609 bgcolor=#E9E9E9
| 452609 ||  || — || August 4, 2005 || Palomar || NEAT || — || align=right | 2.8 km || 
|-id=610 bgcolor=#fefefe
| 452610 ||  || — || August 27, 2005 || Kitt Peak || Spacewatch || — || align=right data-sort-value="0.70" | 700 m || 
|-id=611 bgcolor=#E9E9E9
| 452611 ||  || — || August 28, 2005 || Kitt Peak || Spacewatch || DOR || align=right | 2.6 km || 
|-id=612 bgcolor=#fefefe
| 452612 ||  || — || August 28, 2005 || Anderson Mesa || LONEOS || — || align=right data-sort-value="0.63" | 630 m || 
|-id=613 bgcolor=#fefefe
| 452613 ||  || — || August 26, 2005 || Anderson Mesa || LONEOS || — || align=right data-sort-value="0.58" | 580 m || 
|-id=614 bgcolor=#E9E9E9
| 452614 ||  || — || August 28, 2005 || Kitt Peak || Spacewatch || — || align=right | 2.1 km || 
|-id=615 bgcolor=#fefefe
| 452615 ||  || — || August 28, 2005 || Kitt Peak || Spacewatch || — || align=right data-sort-value="0.57" | 570 m || 
|-id=616 bgcolor=#E9E9E9
| 452616 ||  || — || August 28, 2005 || Kitt Peak || Spacewatch || — || align=right | 2.1 km || 
|-id=617 bgcolor=#E9E9E9
| 452617 ||  || — || August 28, 2005 || Siding Spring || SSS || — || align=right | 2.2 km || 
|-id=618 bgcolor=#E9E9E9
| 452618 ||  || — || September 1, 2005 || Anderson Mesa || LONEOS || — || align=right | 2.7 km || 
|-id=619 bgcolor=#fefefe
| 452619 ||  || — || August 30, 2005 || Kitt Peak || Spacewatch || — || align=right data-sort-value="0.67" | 670 m || 
|-id=620 bgcolor=#fefefe
| 452620 ||  || — || August 28, 2005 || Kitt Peak || Spacewatch || — || align=right data-sort-value="0.50" | 500 m || 
|-id=621 bgcolor=#fefefe
| 452621 ||  || — || September 24, 2005 || Kitt Peak || Spacewatch || — || align=right data-sort-value="0.61" | 610 m || 
|-id=622 bgcolor=#d6d6d6
| 452622 ||  || — || September 24, 2005 || Kitt Peak || Spacewatch || critical || align=right | 1.4 km || 
|-id=623 bgcolor=#d6d6d6
| 452623 ||  || — || September 27, 2005 || Kitt Peak || Spacewatch || — || align=right | 1.6 km || 
|-id=624 bgcolor=#d6d6d6
| 452624 ||  || — || September 25, 2005 || Kitt Peak || Spacewatch || — || align=right | 2.1 km || 
|-id=625 bgcolor=#E9E9E9
| 452625 ||  || — || September 29, 2005 || Mount Lemmon || Mount Lemmon Survey || — || align=right | 2.0 km || 
|-id=626 bgcolor=#fefefe
| 452626 ||  || — || July 12, 2005 || Kitt Peak || Spacewatch || — || align=right data-sort-value="0.71" | 710 m || 
|-id=627 bgcolor=#E9E9E9
| 452627 ||  || — || September 29, 2005 || Anderson Mesa || LONEOS || DOR || align=right | 3.0 km || 
|-id=628 bgcolor=#fefefe
| 452628 ||  || — || September 30, 2005 || Kitt Peak || Spacewatch || — || align=right data-sort-value="0.56" | 560 m || 
|-id=629 bgcolor=#fefefe
| 452629 ||  || — || September 22, 2005 || Palomar || NEAT || — || align=right data-sort-value="0.64" | 640 m || 
|-id=630 bgcolor=#d6d6d6
| 452630 ||  || — || September 24, 2005 || Apache Point || A. C. Becker || — || align=right | 1.7 km || 
|-id=631 bgcolor=#fefefe
| 452631 ||  || — || October 3, 2005 || Catalina || CSS || — || align=right data-sort-value="0.62" | 620 m || 
|-id=632 bgcolor=#fefefe
| 452632 ||  || — || October 3, 2005 || Catalina || CSS || — || align=right data-sort-value="0.58" | 580 m || 
|-id=633 bgcolor=#E9E9E9
| 452633 ||  || — || October 1, 2005 || Catalina || CSS || — || align=right | 2.3 km || 
|-id=634 bgcolor=#fefefe
| 452634 ||  || — || October 9, 2005 || Kitt Peak || Spacewatch || — || align=right data-sort-value="0.55" | 550 m || 
|-id=635 bgcolor=#E9E9E9
| 452635 ||  || — || September 29, 2005 || Mount Lemmon || Mount Lemmon Survey || — || align=right | 1.6 km || 
|-id=636 bgcolor=#d6d6d6
| 452636 ||  || — || October 7, 2005 || Kitt Peak || Spacewatch || KOR || align=right | 1.2 km || 
|-id=637 bgcolor=#fefefe
| 452637 ||  || — || September 29, 2005 || Kitt Peak || Spacewatch || — || align=right data-sort-value="0.52" | 520 m || 
|-id=638 bgcolor=#d6d6d6
| 452638 ||  || — || October 1, 2005 || Kitt Peak || Spacewatch || — || align=right | 1.8 km || 
|-id=639 bgcolor=#FFC2E0
| 452639 ||  || — || October 29, 2005 || Palomar || NEAT || APO +1kmcritical || align=right | 2.2 km || 
|-id=640 bgcolor=#d6d6d6
| 452640 ||  || — || October 22, 2005 || Catalina || CSS || — || align=right | 2.8 km || 
|-id=641 bgcolor=#d6d6d6
| 452641 ||  || — || October 22, 2005 || Kitt Peak || Spacewatch || KOR || align=right | 1.1 km || 
|-id=642 bgcolor=#d6d6d6
| 452642 ||  || — || October 22, 2005 || Kitt Peak || Spacewatch || — || align=right | 2.7 km || 
|-id=643 bgcolor=#fefefe
| 452643 ||  || — || October 23, 2005 || Kitt Peak || Spacewatch || — || align=right data-sort-value="0.62" | 620 m || 
|-id=644 bgcolor=#E9E9E9
| 452644 ||  || — || October 23, 2005 || Catalina || CSS || — || align=right | 2.9 km || 
|-id=645 bgcolor=#fefefe
| 452645 ||  || — || October 24, 2005 || Kitt Peak || Spacewatch || — || align=right data-sort-value="0.55" | 550 m || 
|-id=646 bgcolor=#d6d6d6
| 452646 ||  || — || October 24, 2005 || Kitt Peak || Spacewatch || — || align=right | 2.1 km || 
|-id=647 bgcolor=#E9E9E9
| 452647 ||  || — || October 25, 2005 || Anderson Mesa || LONEOS || EUN || align=right | 1.2 km || 
|-id=648 bgcolor=#fefefe
| 452648 ||  || — || October 25, 2005 || Mount Lemmon || Mount Lemmon Survey || — || align=right data-sort-value="0.67" | 670 m || 
|-id=649 bgcolor=#fefefe
| 452649 ||  || — || October 25, 2005 || Mount Lemmon || Mount Lemmon Survey || — || align=right data-sort-value="0.55" | 550 m || 
|-id=650 bgcolor=#d6d6d6
| 452650 ||  || — || October 25, 2005 || Kitt Peak || Spacewatch || — || align=right | 2.2 km || 
|-id=651 bgcolor=#FA8072
| 452651 ||  || — || October 25, 2005 || Mount Lemmon || Mount Lemmon Survey || — || align=right data-sort-value="0.45" | 450 m || 
|-id=652 bgcolor=#d6d6d6
| 452652 ||  || — || October 25, 2005 || Kitt Peak || Spacewatch || KOR || align=right | 1.1 km || 
|-id=653 bgcolor=#fefefe
| 452653 ||  || — || October 27, 2005 || Kitt Peak || Spacewatch || — || align=right data-sort-value="0.68" | 680 m || 
|-id=654 bgcolor=#fefefe
| 452654 ||  || — || October 29, 2005 || Mount Lemmon || Mount Lemmon Survey || — || align=right data-sort-value="0.91" | 910 m || 
|-id=655 bgcolor=#d6d6d6
| 452655 ||  || — || October 27, 2005 || Kitt Peak || Spacewatch || — || align=right | 2.7 km || 
|-id=656 bgcolor=#d6d6d6
| 452656 ||  || — || October 12, 2005 || Kitt Peak || Spacewatch || KOR || align=right | 1.1 km || 
|-id=657 bgcolor=#d6d6d6
| 452657 ||  || — || October 30, 2005 || Kitt Peak || Spacewatch || — || align=right | 2.9 km || 
|-id=658 bgcolor=#FA8072
| 452658 ||  || — || October 30, 2005 || Kitt Peak || Spacewatch || — || align=right data-sort-value="0.57" | 570 m || 
|-id=659 bgcolor=#d6d6d6
| 452659 ||  || — || October 23, 2005 || Catalina || CSS || — || align=right | 2.4 km || 
|-id=660 bgcolor=#fefefe
| 452660 ||  || — || October 23, 2005 || Catalina || CSS || — || align=right data-sort-value="0.82" | 820 m || 
|-id=661 bgcolor=#E9E9E9
| 452661 ||  || — || October 29, 2005 || Catalina || CSS || — || align=right | 2.3 km || 
|-id=662 bgcolor=#d6d6d6
| 452662 ||  || — || October 24, 2005 || Kitt Peak || Spacewatch || EOS || align=right | 1.8 km || 
|-id=663 bgcolor=#d6d6d6
| 452663 ||  || — || September 30, 2005 || Mount Lemmon || Mount Lemmon Survey || — || align=right | 2.3 km || 
|-id=664 bgcolor=#d6d6d6
| 452664 ||  || — || November 1, 2005 || Kitt Peak || Spacewatch || — || align=right | 1.9 km || 
|-id=665 bgcolor=#d6d6d6
| 452665 ||  || — || November 25, 2005 || Kitt Peak || Spacewatch || — || align=right | 2.1 km || 
|-id=666 bgcolor=#FA8072
| 452666 ||  || — || November 26, 2005 || Socorro || LINEAR || — || align=right | 1.4 km || 
|-id=667 bgcolor=#d6d6d6
| 452667 ||  || — || November 22, 2005 || Kitt Peak || Spacewatch || — || align=right | 2.0 km || 
|-id=668 bgcolor=#d6d6d6
| 452668 ||  || — || November 25, 2005 || Mount Lemmon || Mount Lemmon Survey || — || align=right | 2.5 km || 
|-id=669 bgcolor=#fefefe
| 452669 ||  || — || November 28, 2005 || Catalina || CSS || — || align=right data-sort-value="0.57" | 570 m || 
|-id=670 bgcolor=#d6d6d6
| 452670 ||  || — || October 25, 2005 || Kitt Peak || Spacewatch || — || align=right | 2.4 km || 
|-id=671 bgcolor=#d6d6d6
| 452671 ||  || — || November 25, 2005 || Mount Lemmon || Mount Lemmon Survey || EOS || align=right | 1.8 km || 
|-id=672 bgcolor=#fefefe
| 452672 ||  || — || November 22, 2005 || Kitt Peak || Spacewatch || V || align=right data-sort-value="0.80" | 800 m || 
|-id=673 bgcolor=#d6d6d6
| 452673 ||  || — || November 25, 2005 || Kitt Peak || Spacewatch ||  || align=right | 2.2 km || 
|-id=674 bgcolor=#fefefe
| 452674 ||  || — || November 5, 2005 || Kitt Peak || Spacewatch || — || align=right data-sort-value="0.66" | 660 m || 
|-id=675 bgcolor=#fefefe
| 452675 ||  || — || November 30, 2005 || Kitt Peak || Spacewatch || — || align=right data-sort-value="0.55" | 550 m || 
|-id=676 bgcolor=#d6d6d6
| 452676 ||  || — || November 21, 2005 || Catalina || CSS || BRA || align=right | 1.9 km || 
|-id=677 bgcolor=#fefefe
| 452677 ||  || — || November 25, 2005 || Mount Lemmon || Mount Lemmon Survey || — || align=right data-sort-value="0.61" | 610 m || 
|-id=678 bgcolor=#fefefe
| 452678 ||  || — || November 1, 2005 || Mount Lemmon || Mount Lemmon Survey || — || align=right data-sort-value="0.76" | 760 m || 
|-id=679 bgcolor=#d6d6d6
| 452679 ||  || — || October 29, 2005 || Kitt Peak || Spacewatch || KOR || align=right | 1.1 km || 
|-id=680 bgcolor=#d6d6d6
| 452680 ||  || — || December 2, 2005 || Kitt Peak || Spacewatch || — || align=right | 3.9 km || 
|-id=681 bgcolor=#fefefe
| 452681 ||  || — || December 5, 2005 || Mount Lemmon || Mount Lemmon Survey || — || align=right data-sort-value="0.47" | 470 m || 
|-id=682 bgcolor=#d6d6d6
| 452682 ||  || — || December 2, 2005 || Kitt Peak || Spacewatch || KOR || align=right | 1.2 km || 
|-id=683 bgcolor=#d6d6d6
| 452683 ||  || — || December 3, 2005 || Kitt Peak || Spacewatch || — || align=right | 2.7 km || 
|-id=684 bgcolor=#d6d6d6
| 452684 ||  || — || December 3, 2005 || Kitt Peak || Spacewatch || — || align=right | 3.0 km || 
|-id=685 bgcolor=#d6d6d6
| 452685 ||  || — || December 6, 2005 || Kitt Peak || Spacewatch || KOR || align=right | 1.2 km || 
|-id=686 bgcolor=#d6d6d6
| 452686 ||  || — || December 2, 2005 || Kitt Peak || Spacewatch || — || align=right | 3.6 km || 
|-id=687 bgcolor=#d6d6d6
| 452687 ||  || — || November 25, 2005 || Mount Lemmon || Mount Lemmon Survey || EOS || align=right | 1.7 km || 
|-id=688 bgcolor=#d6d6d6
| 452688 ||  || — || November 10, 2005 || Mount Lemmon || Mount Lemmon Survey || EOS || align=right | 1.6 km || 
|-id=689 bgcolor=#fefefe
| 452689 ||  || — || October 25, 2005 || Mount Lemmon || Mount Lemmon Survey || — || align=right data-sort-value="0.64" | 640 m || 
|-id=690 bgcolor=#d6d6d6
| 452690 ||  || — || December 1, 2005 || Kitt Peak || Spacewatch || — || align=right | 3.1 km || 
|-id=691 bgcolor=#FA8072
| 452691 ||  || — || December 23, 2005 || Palomar || NEAT || unusual || align=right | 5.0 km || 
|-id=692 bgcolor=#fefefe
| 452692 ||  || — || November 30, 2005 || Kitt Peak || Spacewatch || — || align=right data-sort-value="0.67" | 670 m || 
|-id=693 bgcolor=#fefefe
| 452693 ||  || — || December 24, 2005 || Kitt Peak || Spacewatch || — || align=right data-sort-value="0.61" | 610 m || 
|-id=694 bgcolor=#FA8072
| 452694 ||  || — || December 24, 2005 || Kitt Peak || Spacewatch || H || align=right data-sort-value="0.72" | 720 m || 
|-id=695 bgcolor=#d6d6d6
| 452695 ||  || — || December 22, 2005 || Kitt Peak || Spacewatch || EOS || align=right | 2.0 km || 
|-id=696 bgcolor=#d6d6d6
| 452696 ||  || — || December 21, 2005 || Catalina || CSS || — || align=right | 3.7 km || 
|-id=697 bgcolor=#fefefe
| 452697 ||  || — || December 24, 2005 || Kitt Peak || Spacewatch || — || align=right data-sort-value="0.48" | 480 m || 
|-id=698 bgcolor=#d6d6d6
| 452698 ||  || — || December 2, 2005 || Mount Lemmon || Mount Lemmon Survey || — || align=right | 2.7 km || 
|-id=699 bgcolor=#fefefe
| 452699 ||  || — || May 9, 2000 || Kitt Peak || Spacewatch || — || align=right data-sort-value="0.79" | 790 m || 
|-id=700 bgcolor=#d6d6d6
| 452700 ||  || — || December 24, 2005 || Kitt Peak || Spacewatch || — || align=right | 2.0 km || 
|}

452701–452800 

|-bgcolor=#d6d6d6
| 452701 ||  || — || December 4, 2005 || Kitt Peak || Spacewatch || THM || align=right | 1.7 km || 
|-id=702 bgcolor=#fefefe
| 452702 ||  || — || December 24, 2005 || Kitt Peak || Spacewatch || — || align=right data-sort-value="0.62" | 620 m || 
|-id=703 bgcolor=#d6d6d6
| 452703 ||  || — || October 12, 2005 || Kitt Peak || Spacewatch || — || align=right | 2.8 km || 
|-id=704 bgcolor=#d6d6d6
| 452704 ||  || — || December 25, 2005 || Mount Lemmon || Mount Lemmon Survey || — || align=right | 2.6 km || 
|-id=705 bgcolor=#fefefe
| 452705 ||  || — || December 27, 2005 || Mount Lemmon || Mount Lemmon Survey || — || align=right data-sort-value="0.65" | 650 m || 
|-id=706 bgcolor=#d6d6d6
| 452706 ||  || — || December 1, 2005 || Kitt Peak || Spacewatch || EOS || align=right | 1.6 km || 
|-id=707 bgcolor=#d6d6d6
| 452707 ||  || — || November 30, 2005 || Mount Lemmon || Mount Lemmon Survey || EOS || align=right | 2.0 km || 
|-id=708 bgcolor=#d6d6d6
| 452708 ||  || — || December 25, 2005 || Kitt Peak || Spacewatch || EOS || align=right | 2.1 km || 
|-id=709 bgcolor=#d6d6d6
| 452709 ||  || — || December 27, 2005 || Kitt Peak || Spacewatch || — || align=right | 2.7 km || 
|-id=710 bgcolor=#d6d6d6
| 452710 ||  || — || October 29, 2005 || Mount Lemmon || Mount Lemmon Survey || EOS || align=right | 2.1 km || 
|-id=711 bgcolor=#FA8072
| 452711 ||  || — || December 25, 2005 || Kitt Peak || Spacewatch || H || align=right data-sort-value="0.64" | 640 m || 
|-id=712 bgcolor=#fefefe
| 452712 ||  || — || December 25, 2005 || Mount Lemmon || Mount Lemmon Survey || — || align=right data-sort-value="0.67" | 670 m || 
|-id=713 bgcolor=#fefefe
| 452713 ||  || — || December 26, 2005 || Kitt Peak || Spacewatch || — || align=right data-sort-value="0.59" | 590 m || 
|-id=714 bgcolor=#d6d6d6
| 452714 ||  || — || December 26, 2005 || Kitt Peak || Spacewatch || critical || align=right | 2.8 km || 
|-id=715 bgcolor=#d6d6d6
| 452715 ||  || — || December 27, 2005 || Kitt Peak || Spacewatch || EOS || align=right | 1.5 km || 
|-id=716 bgcolor=#d6d6d6
| 452716 ||  || — || December 27, 2005 || Kitt Peak || Spacewatch || EMA || align=right | 2.5 km || 
|-id=717 bgcolor=#d6d6d6
| 452717 ||  || — || December 30, 2005 || Kitt Peak || Spacewatch || — || align=right | 2.5 km || 
|-id=718 bgcolor=#d6d6d6
| 452718 ||  || — || December 28, 2005 || Kitt Peak || Spacewatch || — || align=right | 2.3 km || 
|-id=719 bgcolor=#d6d6d6
| 452719 ||  || — || December 25, 2005 || Mount Lemmon || Mount Lemmon Survey || — || align=right | 2.3 km || 
|-id=720 bgcolor=#fefefe
| 452720 ||  || — || December 25, 2005 || Kitt Peak || Spacewatch || — || align=right data-sort-value="0.75" | 750 m || 
|-id=721 bgcolor=#d6d6d6
| 452721 ||  || — || December 29, 2005 || Kitt Peak || Spacewatch || — || align=right | 2.6 km || 
|-id=722 bgcolor=#d6d6d6
| 452722 ||  || — || December 29, 2005 || Kitt Peak || Spacewatch || EOS || align=right | 1.6 km || 
|-id=723 bgcolor=#d6d6d6
| 452723 ||  || — || December 27, 2005 || Kitt Peak || Spacewatch || — || align=right | 2.1 km || 
|-id=724 bgcolor=#E9E9E9
| 452724 ||  || — || December 21, 2005 || Kitt Peak || Spacewatch || — || align=right | 2.4 km || 
|-id=725 bgcolor=#d6d6d6
| 452725 ||  || — || October 7, 2005 || Mount Lemmon || Mount Lemmon Survey || — || align=right | 3.3 km || 
|-id=726 bgcolor=#fefefe
| 452726 ||  || — || January 4, 2006 || Kitt Peak || Spacewatch || — || align=right data-sort-value="0.62" | 620 m || 
|-id=727 bgcolor=#d6d6d6
| 452727 ||  || — || January 4, 2006 || Kitt Peak || Spacewatch || — || align=right | 2.9 km || 
|-id=728 bgcolor=#d6d6d6
| 452728 ||  || — || December 30, 2005 || Kitt Peak || Spacewatch || — || align=right | 2.5 km || 
|-id=729 bgcolor=#d6d6d6
| 452729 ||  || — || January 9, 2006 || Kitt Peak || Spacewatch || — || align=right | 2.2 km || 
|-id=730 bgcolor=#d6d6d6
| 452730 ||  || — || October 28, 2005 || Mount Lemmon || Mount Lemmon Survey || TIR || align=right | 3.6 km || 
|-id=731 bgcolor=#d6d6d6
| 452731 ||  || — || January 7, 2006 || Mount Lemmon || Mount Lemmon Survey || EOS || align=right | 2.1 km || 
|-id=732 bgcolor=#d6d6d6
| 452732 ||  || — || January 8, 2006 || Mount Lemmon || Mount Lemmon Survey || — || align=right | 3.0 km || 
|-id=733 bgcolor=#d6d6d6
| 452733 ||  || — || January 22, 2006 || Mount Lemmon || Mount Lemmon Survey || EOS || align=right | 1.9 km || 
|-id=734 bgcolor=#d6d6d6
| 452734 ||  || — || January 23, 2006 || Junk Bond || D. Healy || — || align=right | 2.3 km || 
|-id=735 bgcolor=#fefefe
| 452735 ||  || — || January 22, 2006 || Mount Lemmon || Mount Lemmon Survey || — || align=right data-sort-value="0.76" | 760 m || 
|-id=736 bgcolor=#d6d6d6
| 452736 ||  || — || January 23, 2006 || Mount Lemmon || Mount Lemmon Survey || — || align=right | 2.6 km || 
|-id=737 bgcolor=#fefefe
| 452737 ||  || — || January 25, 2006 || Kitt Peak || Spacewatch || — || align=right data-sort-value="0.61" | 610 m || 
|-id=738 bgcolor=#d6d6d6
| 452738 ||  || — || January 10, 2006 || Kitt Peak || Spacewatch || — || align=right | 2.7 km || 
|-id=739 bgcolor=#d6d6d6
| 452739 ||  || — || January 22, 2006 || Mount Lemmon || Mount Lemmon Survey || EOS || align=right | 1.7 km || 
|-id=740 bgcolor=#d6d6d6
| 452740 ||  || — || January 23, 2006 || Kitt Peak || Spacewatch || — || align=right | 2.4 km || 
|-id=741 bgcolor=#d6d6d6
| 452741 ||  || — || January 25, 2006 || Kitt Peak || Spacewatch || — || align=right | 2.8 km || 
|-id=742 bgcolor=#d6d6d6
| 452742 ||  || — || January 25, 2006 || Kitt Peak || Spacewatch || — || align=right | 3.0 km || 
|-id=743 bgcolor=#fefefe
| 452743 ||  || — || January 26, 2006 || Kitt Peak || Spacewatch || — || align=right data-sort-value="0.76" | 760 m || 
|-id=744 bgcolor=#d6d6d6
| 452744 ||  || — || January 22, 2006 || Mount Lemmon || Mount Lemmon Survey || — || align=right | 2.6 km || 
|-id=745 bgcolor=#d6d6d6
| 452745 ||  || — || January 25, 2006 || Kitt Peak || Spacewatch || — || align=right | 2.2 km || 
|-id=746 bgcolor=#fefefe
| 452746 ||  || — || January 26, 2006 || Kitt Peak || Spacewatch || — || align=right data-sort-value="0.67" | 670 m || 
|-id=747 bgcolor=#d6d6d6
| 452747 ||  || — || January 27, 2006 || Kitt Peak || Spacewatch || — || align=right | 2.5 km || 
|-id=748 bgcolor=#d6d6d6
| 452748 ||  || — || January 27, 2006 || Mount Lemmon || Mount Lemmon Survey || — || align=right | 2.2 km || 
|-id=749 bgcolor=#fefefe
| 452749 ||  || — || January 28, 2006 || Mount Lemmon || Mount Lemmon Survey || — || align=right data-sort-value="0.50" | 500 m || 
|-id=750 bgcolor=#d6d6d6
| 452750 ||  || — || January 30, 2006 || Kitt Peak || Spacewatch || — || align=right | 2.4 km || 
|-id=751 bgcolor=#d6d6d6
| 452751 ||  || — || January 30, 2006 || Kitt Peak || Spacewatch || — || align=right | 3.2 km || 
|-id=752 bgcolor=#d6d6d6
| 452752 ||  || — || January 31, 2006 || Kitt Peak || Spacewatch || THM || align=right | 2.0 km || 
|-id=753 bgcolor=#d6d6d6
| 452753 ||  || — || January 25, 2006 || Kitt Peak || Spacewatch || THM || align=right | 2.1 km || 
|-id=754 bgcolor=#fefefe
| 452754 ||  || — || January 31, 2006 || Kitt Peak || Spacewatch || — || align=right data-sort-value="0.61" | 610 m || 
|-id=755 bgcolor=#d6d6d6
| 452755 ||  || — || January 31, 2006 || Kitt Peak || Spacewatch || — || align=right | 2.3 km || 
|-id=756 bgcolor=#d6d6d6
| 452756 ||  || — || January 25, 2006 || Kitt Peak || Spacewatch || THM || align=right | 2.1 km || 
|-id=757 bgcolor=#d6d6d6
| 452757 ||  || — || January 31, 2006 || Kitt Peak || Spacewatch || — || align=right | 2.8 km || 
|-id=758 bgcolor=#d6d6d6
| 452758 ||  || — || January 23, 2006 || Kitt Peak || Spacewatch || — || align=right | 2.8 km || 
|-id=759 bgcolor=#d6d6d6
| 452759 ||  || — || January 31, 2006 || Kitt Peak || Spacewatch || THM || align=right | 2.2 km || 
|-id=760 bgcolor=#d6d6d6
| 452760 ||  || — || January 4, 2006 || Mount Lemmon || Mount Lemmon Survey || LIX || align=right | 3.3 km || 
|-id=761 bgcolor=#d6d6d6
| 452761 ||  || — || January 8, 2006 || Catalina || CSS || — || align=right | 3.9 km || 
|-id=762 bgcolor=#d6d6d6
| 452762 ||  || — || January 23, 2006 || Mount Lemmon || Mount Lemmon Survey || — || align=right | 2.0 km || 
|-id=763 bgcolor=#d6d6d6
| 452763 ||  || — || February 1, 2006 || Mount Lemmon || Mount Lemmon Survey || — || align=right | 2.8 km || 
|-id=764 bgcolor=#d6d6d6
| 452764 ||  || — || February 1, 2006 || Mount Lemmon || Mount Lemmon Survey || — || align=right | 2.7 km || 
|-id=765 bgcolor=#d6d6d6
| 452765 ||  || — || January 5, 2006 || Mount Lemmon || Mount Lemmon Survey || — || align=right | 2.6 km || 
|-id=766 bgcolor=#d6d6d6
| 452766 ||  || — || January 18, 2006 || Catalina || CSS || — || align=right | 3.0 km || 
|-id=767 bgcolor=#d6d6d6
| 452767 ||  || — || January 20, 2006 || Kitt Peak || Spacewatch || — || align=right | 2.8 km || 
|-id=768 bgcolor=#d6d6d6
| 452768 ||  || — || February 2, 2006 || Kitt Peak || Spacewatch || — || align=right | 3.2 km || 
|-id=769 bgcolor=#d6d6d6
| 452769 ||  || — || January 22, 2006 || Mount Lemmon || Mount Lemmon Survey || — || align=right | 3.1 km || 
|-id=770 bgcolor=#fefefe
| 452770 ||  || — || February 3, 2006 || Kitt Peak || Spacewatch || — || align=right data-sort-value="0.50" | 500 m || 
|-id=771 bgcolor=#d6d6d6
| 452771 ||  || — || December 13, 1999 || Kitt Peak || Spacewatch || HYG || align=right | 2.4 km || 
|-id=772 bgcolor=#d6d6d6
| 452772 ||  || — || February 2, 2006 || Kitt Peak || Spacewatch || — || align=right | 2.9 km || 
|-id=773 bgcolor=#FA8072
| 452773 ||  || — || February 22, 2006 || Anderson Mesa || LONEOS || unusual || align=right | 1.9 km || 
|-id=774 bgcolor=#d6d6d6
| 452774 ||  || — || February 1, 2006 || Kitt Peak || Spacewatch || — || align=right | 2.6 km || 
|-id=775 bgcolor=#d6d6d6
| 452775 ||  || — || February 20, 2006 || Kitt Peak || Spacewatch || — || align=right | 2.9 km || 
|-id=776 bgcolor=#d6d6d6
| 452776 ||  || — || February 2, 2006 || Mount Lemmon || Mount Lemmon Survey || — || align=right | 1.9 km || 
|-id=777 bgcolor=#d6d6d6
| 452777 ||  || — || February 20, 2006 || Kitt Peak || Spacewatch || — || align=right | 1.9 km || 
|-id=778 bgcolor=#fefefe
| 452778 ||  || — || February 24, 2006 || Kitt Peak || Spacewatch || — || align=right | 1.0 km || 
|-id=779 bgcolor=#d6d6d6
| 452779 ||  || — || February 24, 2006 || Kitt Peak || Spacewatch || — || align=right | 2.9 km || 
|-id=780 bgcolor=#fefefe
| 452780 ||  || — || February 24, 2006 || Kitt Peak || Spacewatch || — || align=right data-sort-value="0.75" | 750 m || 
|-id=781 bgcolor=#fefefe
| 452781 ||  || — || February 27, 2006 || Kitt Peak || Spacewatch || — || align=right data-sort-value="0.73" | 730 m || 
|-id=782 bgcolor=#fefefe
| 452782 ||  || — || February 25, 2006 || Kitt Peak || Spacewatch || — || align=right data-sort-value="0.72" | 720 m || 
|-id=783 bgcolor=#fefefe
| 452783 ||  || — || February 21, 2006 || Mount Lemmon || Mount Lemmon Survey || — || align=right data-sort-value="0.47" | 470 m || 
|-id=784 bgcolor=#d6d6d6
| 452784 ||  || — || March 5, 2006 || Kitt Peak || Spacewatch || — || align=right | 2.7 km || 
|-id=785 bgcolor=#d6d6d6
| 452785 ||  || — || March 5, 2006 || Kitt Peak || Spacewatch || HYG || align=right | 2.6 km || 
|-id=786 bgcolor=#d6d6d6
| 452786 ||  || — || March 4, 2006 || Mount Lemmon || Mount Lemmon Survey || — || align=right | 2.6 km || 
|-id=787 bgcolor=#fefefe
| 452787 ||  || — || March 23, 2006 || Kitt Peak || Spacewatch || — || align=right data-sort-value="0.66" | 660 m || 
|-id=788 bgcolor=#fefefe
| 452788 ||  || — || March 25, 2006 || Kitt Peak || Spacewatch || — || align=right data-sort-value="0.68" | 680 m || 
|-id=789 bgcolor=#fefefe
| 452789 ||  || — || December 4, 2005 || Kitt Peak || Spacewatch || — || align=right | 1.1 km || 
|-id=790 bgcolor=#d6d6d6
| 452790 ||  || — || February 27, 2006 || Catalina || CSS || — || align=right | 3.8 km || 
|-id=791 bgcolor=#fefefe
| 452791 ||  || — || March 23, 2006 || Kitt Peak || Spacewatch || — || align=right data-sort-value="0.62" | 620 m || 
|-id=792 bgcolor=#d6d6d6
| 452792 ||  || — || April 7, 2006 || Anderson Mesa || LONEOS || — || align=right | 4.5 km || 
|-id=793 bgcolor=#fefefe
| 452793 ||  || — || April 9, 2006 || Kitt Peak || Spacewatch || MAS || align=right data-sort-value="0.55" | 550 m || 
|-id=794 bgcolor=#fefefe
| 452794 ||  || — || April 20, 2006 || Kitt Peak || Spacewatch || — || align=right data-sort-value="0.70" | 700 m || 
|-id=795 bgcolor=#fefefe
| 452795 ||  || — || April 2, 2006 || Kitt Peak || Spacewatch || — || align=right data-sort-value="0.85" | 850 m || 
|-id=796 bgcolor=#d6d6d6
| 452796 ||  || — || February 25, 2006 || Catalina || CSS || — || align=right | 3.6 km || 
|-id=797 bgcolor=#fefefe
| 452797 ||  || — || April 24, 2006 || Anderson Mesa || LONEOS || — || align=right | 1.1 km || 
|-id=798 bgcolor=#fefefe
| 452798 ||  || — || April 30, 2006 || Catalina || CSS || — || align=right data-sort-value="0.97" | 970 m || 
|-id=799 bgcolor=#d6d6d6
| 452799 ||  || — || April 25, 2006 || Kitt Peak || Spacewatch || — || align=right | 3.0 km || 
|-id=800 bgcolor=#fefefe
| 452800 ||  || — || May 3, 2006 || Mount Lemmon || Mount Lemmon Survey || NYS || align=right data-sort-value="0.66" | 660 m || 
|}

452801–452900 

|-bgcolor=#fefefe
| 452801 ||  || — || April 26, 2006 || Mount Lemmon || Mount Lemmon Survey || ERI || align=right | 1.4 km || 
|-id=802 bgcolor=#d6d6d6
| 452802 ||  || — || April 2, 2006 || Anderson Mesa || LONEOS || — || align=right | 3.0 km || 
|-id=803 bgcolor=#fefefe
| 452803 ||  || — || May 20, 2006 || Catalina || CSS || — || align=right data-sort-value="0.99" | 990 m || 
|-id=804 bgcolor=#d6d6d6
| 452804 ||  || — || May 20, 2006 || Kitt Peak || Spacewatch || — || align=right | 4.4 km || 
|-id=805 bgcolor=#fefefe
| 452805 ||  || — || May 6, 2006 || Mount Lemmon || Mount Lemmon Survey || — || align=right data-sort-value="0.91" | 910 m || 
|-id=806 bgcolor=#fefefe
| 452806 ||  || — || May 3, 2006 || Kitt Peak || Spacewatch || — || align=right data-sort-value="0.80" | 800 m || 
|-id=807 bgcolor=#FFC2E0
| 452807 ||  || — || May 28, 2006 || Socorro || LINEAR || APOPHA || align=right data-sort-value="0.19" | 190 m || 
|-id=808 bgcolor=#E9E9E9
| 452808 ||  || — || May 8, 2006 || Mount Lemmon || Mount Lemmon Survey || — || align=right data-sort-value="0.89" | 890 m || 
|-id=809 bgcolor=#fefefe
| 452809 ||  || — || May 30, 2006 || Mount Lemmon || Mount Lemmon Survey || H || align=right data-sort-value="0.86" | 860 m || 
|-id=810 bgcolor=#E9E9E9
| 452810 ||  || — || June 7, 2006 || Siding Spring || SSS || — || align=right | 1.8 km || 
|-id=811 bgcolor=#E9E9E9
| 452811 ||  || — || August 15, 2006 || Hibiscus || S. F. Hönig || — || align=right | 1.0 km || 
|-id=812 bgcolor=#fefefe
| 452812 ||  || — || August 13, 2006 || Palomar || NEAT || — || align=right | 1.3 km || 
|-id=813 bgcolor=#E9E9E9
| 452813 ||  || — || July 30, 2006 || Siding Spring || SSS || — || align=right | 1.7 km || 
|-id=814 bgcolor=#d6d6d6
| 452814 ||  || — || August 12, 2006 || Palomar || NEAT || Tj (2.93) || align=right | 4.0 km || 
|-id=815 bgcolor=#E9E9E9
| 452815 ||  || — || July 21, 2006 || Catalina || CSS || — || align=right | 1.4 km || 
|-id=816 bgcolor=#E9E9E9
| 452816 ||  || — || August 13, 2006 || Siding Spring || SSS || — || align=right | 2.1 km || 
|-id=817 bgcolor=#E9E9E9
| 452817 ||  || — || August 20, 2006 || Palomar || NEAT || — || align=right | 1.9 km || 
|-id=818 bgcolor=#E9E9E9
| 452818 ||  || — || August 17, 2006 || Palomar || NEAT || — || align=right | 2.0 km || 
|-id=819 bgcolor=#E9E9E9
| 452819 ||  || — || August 27, 2006 || Anderson Mesa || LONEOS || — || align=right | 1.9 km || 
|-id=820 bgcolor=#d6d6d6
| 452820 ||  || — || August 16, 2006 || Palomar || NEAT || Tj (2.98) || align=right | 3.5 km || 
|-id=821 bgcolor=#E9E9E9
| 452821 ||  || — || August 18, 2006 || Palomar || NEAT || — || align=right | 1.4 km || 
|-id=822 bgcolor=#E9E9E9
| 452822 ||  || — || August 19, 2006 || Kitt Peak || Spacewatch || — || align=right | 1.8 km || 
|-id=823 bgcolor=#E9E9E9
| 452823 ||  || — || August 30, 2006 || Anderson Mesa || LONEOS || EUN || align=right | 1.3 km || 
|-id=824 bgcolor=#E9E9E9
| 452824 ||  || — || August 27, 2006 || Anderson Mesa || LONEOS || — || align=right | 1.5 km || 
|-id=825 bgcolor=#E9E9E9
| 452825 ||  || — || August 29, 2006 || Anderson Mesa || LONEOS || ADE || align=right | 3.1 km || 
|-id=826 bgcolor=#E9E9E9
| 452826 ||  || — || September 12, 2006 || Catalina || CSS || — || align=right | 1.4 km || 
|-id=827 bgcolor=#E9E9E9
| 452827 ||  || — || September 14, 2006 || Palomar || NEAT || — || align=right | 1.7 km || 
|-id=828 bgcolor=#E9E9E9
| 452828 ||  || — || September 14, 2006 || Kitt Peak || Spacewatch || — || align=right | 1.8 km || 
|-id=829 bgcolor=#E9E9E9
| 452829 ||  || — || September 14, 2006 || Kitt Peak || Spacewatch || — || align=right | 1.2 km || 
|-id=830 bgcolor=#E9E9E9
| 452830 ||  || — || September 15, 2006 || Kitt Peak || Spacewatch || — || align=right | 1.7 km || 
|-id=831 bgcolor=#E9E9E9
| 452831 ||  || — || August 29, 2006 || Kitt Peak || Spacewatch || EUN || align=right | 1.1 km || 
|-id=832 bgcolor=#E9E9E9
| 452832 ||  || — || September 15, 2006 || Kitt Peak || Spacewatch || — || align=right | 1.3 km || 
|-id=833 bgcolor=#E9E9E9
| 452833 ||  || — || September 15, 2006 || Kitt Peak || Spacewatch || — || align=right | 1.6 km || 
|-id=834 bgcolor=#E9E9E9
| 452834 ||  || — || September 15, 2006 || Kitt Peak || Spacewatch || — || align=right | 1.4 km || 
|-id=835 bgcolor=#E9E9E9
| 452835 ||  || — || September 15, 2006 || Kitt Peak || Spacewatch || — || align=right | 1.3 km || 
|-id=836 bgcolor=#E9E9E9
| 452836 ||  || — || September 12, 2006 || Siding Spring || SSS || — || align=right | 2.0 km || 
|-id=837 bgcolor=#E9E9E9
| 452837 ||  || — || September 14, 2006 || Catalina || CSS || — || align=right | 1.2 km || 
|-id=838 bgcolor=#E9E9E9
| 452838 ||  || — || September 17, 2006 || Catalina || CSS || LEO || align=right | 1.6 km || 
|-id=839 bgcolor=#E9E9E9
| 452839 ||  || — || September 17, 2006 || Anderson Mesa || LONEOS || — || align=right | 3.1 km || 
|-id=840 bgcolor=#E9E9E9
| 452840 ||  || — || September 17, 2006 || Kitt Peak || Spacewatch || — || align=right | 1.3 km || 
|-id=841 bgcolor=#E9E9E9
| 452841 ||  || — || September 16, 2006 || Catalina || CSS || MAR || align=right | 1.3 km || 
|-id=842 bgcolor=#E9E9E9
| 452842 ||  || — || September 18, 2006 || Catalina || CSS || — || align=right | 1.5 km || 
|-id=843 bgcolor=#E9E9E9
| 452843 ||  || — || September 18, 2006 || Catalina || CSS || — || align=right | 1.6 km || 
|-id=844 bgcolor=#E9E9E9
| 452844 ||  || — || September 19, 2006 || Anderson Mesa || LONEOS || — || align=right | 1.2 km || 
|-id=845 bgcolor=#E9E9E9
| 452845 ||  || — || September 19, 2006 || Kitt Peak || Spacewatch || — || align=right | 1.1 km || 
|-id=846 bgcolor=#E9E9E9
| 452846 ||  || — || September 17, 2006 || Catalina || CSS || — || align=right | 2.2 km || 
|-id=847 bgcolor=#E9E9E9
| 452847 ||  || — || September 17, 2006 || Catalina || CSS || (1547) || align=right | 1.7 km || 
|-id=848 bgcolor=#E9E9E9
| 452848 ||  || — || September 24, 2006 || Anderson Mesa || LONEOS || — || align=right | 3.2 km || 
|-id=849 bgcolor=#d6d6d6
| 452849 ||  || — || September 22, 2006 || Catalina || CSS || Tj (2.9) || align=right | 6.2 km || 
|-id=850 bgcolor=#E9E9E9
| 452850 ||  || — || September 22, 2006 || Anderson Mesa || LONEOS || — || align=right | 1.9 km || 
|-id=851 bgcolor=#E9E9E9
| 452851 ||  || — || September 19, 2006 || Kitt Peak || Spacewatch || — || align=right data-sort-value="0.98" | 980 m || 
|-id=852 bgcolor=#E9E9E9
| 452852 ||  || — || September 19, 2006 || Kitt Peak || Spacewatch || — || align=right | 1.3 km || 
|-id=853 bgcolor=#E9E9E9
| 452853 ||  || — || September 23, 2006 || Kitt Peak || Spacewatch || — || align=right | 1.2 km || 
|-id=854 bgcolor=#E9E9E9
| 452854 ||  || — || September 25, 2006 || Kitt Peak || Spacewatch || (5) || align=right data-sort-value="0.84" | 840 m || 
|-id=855 bgcolor=#E9E9E9
| 452855 ||  || — || September 17, 2006 || Kitt Peak || Spacewatch || — || align=right | 1.3 km || 
|-id=856 bgcolor=#E9E9E9
| 452856 ||  || — || September 17, 2006 || Kitt Peak || Spacewatch || — || align=right | 1.6 km || 
|-id=857 bgcolor=#E9E9E9
| 452857 ||  || — || August 28, 2006 || Kitt Peak || Spacewatch || — || align=right | 1.3 km || 
|-id=858 bgcolor=#E9E9E9
| 452858 ||  || — || September 27, 2006 || Catalina || CSS || — || align=right | 1.8 km || 
|-id=859 bgcolor=#E9E9E9
| 452859 ||  || — || September 18, 2006 || Kitt Peak || Spacewatch || — || align=right | 1.4 km || 
|-id=860 bgcolor=#E9E9E9
| 452860 ||  || — || September 26, 2006 || Kitt Peak || Spacewatch || — || align=right | 1.9 km || 
|-id=861 bgcolor=#E9E9E9
| 452861 ||  || — || September 15, 2006 || Kitt Peak || Spacewatch || — || align=right | 1.3 km || 
|-id=862 bgcolor=#E9E9E9
| 452862 ||  || — || September 15, 2006 || Kitt Peak || Spacewatch || — || align=right | 1.7 km || 
|-id=863 bgcolor=#E9E9E9
| 452863 ||  || — || September 28, 2006 || Catalina || CSS || — || align=right | 2.7 km || 
|-id=864 bgcolor=#E9E9E9
| 452864 ||  || — || September 25, 2006 || Kitt Peak || Spacewatch || — || align=right | 1.3 km || 
|-id=865 bgcolor=#E9E9E9
| 452865 ||  || — || September 27, 2006 || Catalina || CSS || — || align=right | 1.9 km || 
|-id=866 bgcolor=#E9E9E9
| 452866 ||  || — || September 26, 2006 || Mount Lemmon || Mount Lemmon Survey || — || align=right | 1.3 km || 
|-id=867 bgcolor=#E9E9E9
| 452867 ||  || — || September 17, 2006 || Catalina || CSS || — || align=right | 1.5 km || 
|-id=868 bgcolor=#E9E9E9
| 452868 ||  || — || September 27, 2006 || Kitt Peak || Spacewatch || — || align=right | 2.3 km || 
|-id=869 bgcolor=#E9E9E9
| 452869 ||  || — || September 17, 2006 || Kitt Peak || Spacewatch || — || align=right | 1.4 km || 
|-id=870 bgcolor=#E9E9E9
| 452870 ||  || — || September 27, 2006 || Kitt Peak || Spacewatch || — || align=right | 1.9 km || 
|-id=871 bgcolor=#E9E9E9
| 452871 ||  || — || September 27, 2006 || Kitt Peak || Spacewatch || — || align=right | 1.6 km || 
|-id=872 bgcolor=#E9E9E9
| 452872 ||  || — || September 15, 2006 || Kitt Peak || Spacewatch || — || align=right | 1.3 km || 
|-id=873 bgcolor=#E9E9E9
| 452873 ||  || — || September 16, 2006 || Apache Point || A. C. Becker || — || align=right | 1.3 km || 
|-id=874 bgcolor=#E9E9E9
| 452874 ||  || — || September 30, 2006 || Apache Point || A. C. Becker || JUN || align=right | 1.1 km || 
|-id=875 bgcolor=#E9E9E9
| 452875 ||  || — || September 17, 2006 || Kitt Peak || Spacewatch || — || align=right | 1.9 km || 
|-id=876 bgcolor=#E9E9E9
| 452876 ||  || — || September 26, 2006 || Mount Lemmon || Mount Lemmon Survey || JUN || align=right | 1.0 km || 
|-id=877 bgcolor=#E9E9E9
| 452877 ||  || — || September 27, 2006 || Mount Lemmon || Mount Lemmon Survey || — || align=right | 1.6 km || 
|-id=878 bgcolor=#E9E9E9
| 452878 ||  || — || October 2, 2006 || Mount Lemmon || Mount Lemmon Survey || — || align=right | 1.5 km || 
|-id=879 bgcolor=#E9E9E9
| 452879 ||  || — || October 12, 2006 || Kitt Peak || Spacewatch || — || align=right | 2.2 km || 
|-id=880 bgcolor=#E9E9E9
| 452880 ||  || — || October 12, 2006 || Palomar || NEAT || — || align=right | 2.0 km || 
|-id=881 bgcolor=#E9E9E9
| 452881 ||  || — || September 26, 2006 || Mount Lemmon || Mount Lemmon Survey || — || align=right | 1.3 km || 
|-id=882 bgcolor=#E9E9E9
| 452882 ||  || — || October 12, 2006 || Kitt Peak || Spacewatch || — || align=right | 1.7 km || 
|-id=883 bgcolor=#E9E9E9
| 452883 ||  || — || October 11, 2006 || Palomar || NEAT || — || align=right | 1.6 km || 
|-id=884 bgcolor=#E9E9E9
| 452884 ||  || — || October 13, 2006 || Kitt Peak || Spacewatch || GEF || align=right | 1.2 km || 
|-id=885 bgcolor=#E9E9E9
| 452885 ||  || — || October 3, 2006 || Apache Point || A. C. Becker || — || align=right | 1.5 km || 
|-id=886 bgcolor=#E9E9E9
| 452886 ||  || — || October 15, 2006 || Kitt Peak || Spacewatch || — || align=right | 1.7 km || 
|-id=887 bgcolor=#E9E9E9
| 452887 ||  || — || October 16, 2006 || Catalina || CSS || — || align=right | 2.1 km || 
|-id=888 bgcolor=#E9E9E9
| 452888 ||  || — || October 16, 2006 || Kitt Peak || Spacewatch || — || align=right | 1.2 km || 
|-id=889 bgcolor=#E9E9E9
| 452889 ||  || — || October 16, 2006 || Kitt Peak || Spacewatch || — || align=right | 1.2 km || 
|-id=890 bgcolor=#E9E9E9
| 452890 ||  || — || October 16, 2006 || Kitt Peak || Spacewatch || — || align=right | 1.2 km || 
|-id=891 bgcolor=#E9E9E9
| 452891 ||  || — || October 19, 2006 || Catalina || CSS || JUN || align=right | 1.8 km || 
|-id=892 bgcolor=#E9E9E9
| 452892 ||  || — || October 17, 2006 || Mount Lemmon || Mount Lemmon Survey || — || align=right | 1.5 km || 
|-id=893 bgcolor=#E9E9E9
| 452893 ||  || — || October 17, 2006 || Kitt Peak || Spacewatch || — || align=right | 1.5 km || 
|-id=894 bgcolor=#E9E9E9
| 452894 ||  || — || October 18, 2006 || Kitt Peak || Spacewatch || — || align=right | 1.3 km || 
|-id=895 bgcolor=#E9E9E9
| 452895 ||  || — || October 18, 2006 || Kitt Peak || Spacewatch || — || align=right | 1.7 km || 
|-id=896 bgcolor=#E9E9E9
| 452896 ||  || — || October 21, 2006 || Catalina || CSS || — || align=right | 1.3 km || 
|-id=897 bgcolor=#E9E9E9
| 452897 ||  || — || October 19, 2006 || Catalina || CSS || — || align=right | 1.6 km || 
|-id=898 bgcolor=#E9E9E9
| 452898 ||  || — || October 19, 2006 || Catalina || CSS || — || align=right | 2.4 km || 
|-id=899 bgcolor=#E9E9E9
| 452899 ||  || — || October 20, 2006 || Kitt Peak || Spacewatch || — || align=right | 1.2 km || 
|-id=900 bgcolor=#E9E9E9
| 452900 ||  || — || October 4, 2006 || Mount Lemmon || Mount Lemmon Survey || — || align=right | 1.9 km || 
|}

452901–453000 

|-bgcolor=#E9E9E9
| 452901 ||  || — || October 1, 2006 || Kitt Peak || Spacewatch || — || align=right | 1.3 km || 
|-id=902 bgcolor=#E9E9E9
| 452902 ||  || — || October 20, 2006 || Palomar || NEAT || — || align=right | 1.3 km || 
|-id=903 bgcolor=#E9E9E9
| 452903 ||  || — || September 25, 2006 || Kitt Peak || Spacewatch || — || align=right | 1.2 km || 
|-id=904 bgcolor=#E9E9E9
| 452904 ||  || — || September 26, 2006 || Mount Lemmon || Mount Lemmon Survey || AEO || align=right data-sort-value="0.71" | 710 m || 
|-id=905 bgcolor=#E9E9E9
| 452905 ||  || — || October 16, 2006 || Kitt Peak || Spacewatch || AGN || align=right | 1.1 km || 
|-id=906 bgcolor=#E9E9E9
| 452906 ||  || — || October 21, 2006 || Kitt Peak || Spacewatch || — || align=right | 1.5 km || 
|-id=907 bgcolor=#E9E9E9
| 452907 ||  || — || November 9, 2006 || Kitt Peak || Spacewatch || — || align=right | 1.8 km || 
|-id=908 bgcolor=#E9E9E9
| 452908 ||  || — || November 11, 2006 || Mount Lemmon || Mount Lemmon Survey || — || align=right | 1.2 km || 
|-id=909 bgcolor=#E9E9E9
| 452909 ||  || — || October 22, 2006 || Kitt Peak || Spacewatch || — || align=right | 2.4 km || 
|-id=910 bgcolor=#E9E9E9
| 452910 ||  || — || October 23, 2006 || Catalina || CSS || JUN || align=right | 1.1 km || 
|-id=911 bgcolor=#E9E9E9
| 452911 ||  || — || November 11, 2006 || Kitt Peak || Spacewatch || — || align=right | 1.5 km || 
|-id=912 bgcolor=#E9E9E9
| 452912 ||  || — || November 11, 2006 || Kitt Peak || Spacewatch || NEM || align=right | 1.9 km || 
|-id=913 bgcolor=#E9E9E9
| 452913 ||  || — || November 11, 2006 || Kitt Peak || Spacewatch || — || align=right | 1.6 km || 
|-id=914 bgcolor=#E9E9E9
| 452914 ||  || — || November 11, 2006 || Mount Lemmon || Mount Lemmon Survey || — || align=right | 1.7 km || 
|-id=915 bgcolor=#E9E9E9
| 452915 ||  || — || November 12, 2006 || Mount Lemmon || Mount Lemmon Survey || — || align=right | 1.0 km || 
|-id=916 bgcolor=#E9E9E9
| 452916 ||  || — || September 25, 2006 || Mount Lemmon || Mount Lemmon Survey || — || align=right | 2.2 km || 
|-id=917 bgcolor=#E9E9E9
| 452917 ||  || — || November 14, 2006 || Kitt Peak || Spacewatch || — || align=right | 1.1 km || 
|-id=918 bgcolor=#E9E9E9
| 452918 ||  || — || November 14, 2006 || Kitt Peak || Spacewatch || AGN || align=right | 1.2 km || 
|-id=919 bgcolor=#E9E9E9
| 452919 ||  || — || November 15, 2006 || Kitt Peak || Spacewatch || HOF || align=right | 2.4 km || 
|-id=920 bgcolor=#E9E9E9
| 452920 ||  || — || November 15, 2006 || Catalina || CSS || — || align=right | 1.8 km || 
|-id=921 bgcolor=#E9E9E9
| 452921 ||  || — || October 22, 2006 || Mount Lemmon || Mount Lemmon Survey || — || align=right | 2.6 km || 
|-id=922 bgcolor=#E9E9E9
| 452922 ||  || — || November 15, 2006 || Mount Lemmon || Mount Lemmon Survey || — || align=right | 1.7 km || 
|-id=923 bgcolor=#E9E9E9
| 452923 ||  || — || November 13, 2006 || Catalina || CSS || GEF || align=right | 1.6 km || 
|-id=924 bgcolor=#E9E9E9
| 452924 ||  || — || November 11, 2006 || Kitt Peak || Spacewatch || — || align=right | 2.2 km || 
|-id=925 bgcolor=#E9E9E9
| 452925 ||  || — || November 16, 2006 || Kitt Peak || Spacewatch || — || align=right | 1.7 km || 
|-id=926 bgcolor=#E9E9E9
| 452926 ||  || — || November 16, 2006 || Kitt Peak || Spacewatch || — || align=right | 1.3 km || 
|-id=927 bgcolor=#E9E9E9
| 452927 ||  || — || November 11, 2006 || Kitt Peak || Spacewatch || — || align=right | 1.9 km || 
|-id=928 bgcolor=#E9E9E9
| 452928 ||  || — || October 21, 2006 || Kitt Peak || Spacewatch || AGN || align=right | 1.1 km || 
|-id=929 bgcolor=#E9E9E9
| 452929 ||  || — || October 23, 2006 || Mount Lemmon || Mount Lemmon Survey || — || align=right | 1.7 km || 
|-id=930 bgcolor=#E9E9E9
| 452930 ||  || — || November 18, 2006 || Socorro || LINEAR || — || align=right | 2.9 km || 
|-id=931 bgcolor=#E9E9E9
| 452931 ||  || — || November 18, 2006 || Kitt Peak || Spacewatch || — || align=right | 2.0 km || 
|-id=932 bgcolor=#E9E9E9
| 452932 ||  || — || November 11, 2006 || Kitt Peak || Spacewatch || AEO || align=right data-sort-value="0.85" | 850 m || 
|-id=933 bgcolor=#E9E9E9
| 452933 ||  || — || November 11, 2006 || Kitt Peak || Spacewatch || — || align=right | 1.8 km || 
|-id=934 bgcolor=#E9E9E9
| 452934 ||  || — || November 20, 2006 || Socorro || LINEAR || — || align=right | 1.6 km || 
|-id=935 bgcolor=#E9E9E9
| 452935 ||  || — || October 22, 2006 || Catalina || CSS || — || align=right | 1.5 km || 
|-id=936 bgcolor=#E9E9E9
| 452936 ||  || — || October 31, 2006 || Mount Lemmon || Mount Lemmon Survey || — || align=right | 2.1 km || 
|-id=937 bgcolor=#E9E9E9
| 452937 ||  || — || November 24, 2006 || Kitt Peak || Spacewatch || — || align=right | 2.0 km || 
|-id=938 bgcolor=#E9E9E9
| 452938 ||  || — || November 29, 2006 || Socorro || LINEAR || EUN || align=right | 1.4 km || 
|-id=939 bgcolor=#E9E9E9
| 452939 ||  || — || December 8, 2006 || Palomar || NEAT || — || align=right | 2.5 km || 
|-id=940 bgcolor=#E9E9E9
| 452940 ||  || — || December 9, 2006 || Kitt Peak || Spacewatch || — || align=right | 2.4 km || 
|-id=941 bgcolor=#E9E9E9
| 452941 ||  || — || December 10, 2006 || Kitt Peak || Spacewatch || — || align=right | 3.1 km || 
|-id=942 bgcolor=#E9E9E9
| 452942 ||  || — || October 17, 2006 || Mount Lemmon || Mount Lemmon Survey || — || align=right | 1.2 km || 
|-id=943 bgcolor=#E9E9E9
| 452943 ||  || — || December 13, 2006 || Mount Lemmon || Mount Lemmon Survey || — || align=right | 2.5 km || 
|-id=944 bgcolor=#E9E9E9
| 452944 ||  || — || December 11, 2006 || Kitt Peak || Spacewatch || — || align=right | 2.4 km || 
|-id=945 bgcolor=#E9E9E9
| 452945 ||  || — || November 23, 2006 || Kitt Peak || Spacewatch || — || align=right | 1.3 km || 
|-id=946 bgcolor=#E9E9E9
| 452946 ||  || — || November 27, 2006 || Socorro || LINEAR || — || align=right | 1.5 km || 
|-id=947 bgcolor=#E9E9E9
| 452947 ||  || — || November 27, 2006 || Kitt Peak || Spacewatch || — || align=right | 2.4 km || 
|-id=948 bgcolor=#E9E9E9
| 452948 ||  || — || December 13, 2006 || Socorro || LINEAR || — || align=right | 2.5 km || 
|-id=949 bgcolor=#E9E9E9
| 452949 ||  || — || December 11, 2006 || Kitt Peak || Spacewatch || — || align=right | 2.3 km || 
|-id=950 bgcolor=#E9E9E9
| 452950 ||  || — || December 13, 2006 || Mount Lemmon || Mount Lemmon Survey || — || align=right | 1.9 km || 
|-id=951 bgcolor=#E9E9E9
| 452951 ||  || — || December 15, 2006 || Kitt Peak || Spacewatch || — || align=right | 2.1 km || 
|-id=952 bgcolor=#E9E9E9
| 452952 || 2007 AC || — || January 6, 2007 || Pla D'Arguines || R. Ferrando || — || align=right | 1.9 km || 
|-id=953 bgcolor=#E9E9E9
| 452953 ||  || — || November 25, 2006 || Mount Lemmon || Mount Lemmon Survey || EUN || align=right | 1.4 km || 
|-id=954 bgcolor=#E9E9E9
| 452954 ||  || — || December 13, 2006 || Kitt Peak || Spacewatch || — || align=right | 3.1 km || 
|-id=955 bgcolor=#E9E9E9
| 452955 ||  || — || January 15, 2007 || Catalina || CSS || — || align=right | 2.0 km || 
|-id=956 bgcolor=#E9E9E9
| 452956 ||  || — || January 15, 2007 || Anderson Mesa || LONEOS || JUN || align=right | 1.3 km || 
|-id=957 bgcolor=#E9E9E9
| 452957 ||  || — || December 26, 2006 || Kitt Peak || Spacewatch || — || align=right | 2.6 km || 
|-id=958 bgcolor=#d6d6d6
| 452958 ||  || — || January 24, 2007 || Mount Lemmon || Mount Lemmon Survey || — || align=right | 2.1 km || 
|-id=959 bgcolor=#E9E9E9
| 452959 ||  || — || November 27, 2006 || Mount Lemmon || Mount Lemmon Survey || — || align=right | 2.4 km || 
|-id=960 bgcolor=#d6d6d6
| 452960 ||  || — || January 17, 2007 || Kitt Peak || Spacewatch || — || align=right | 2.3 km || 
|-id=961 bgcolor=#E9E9E9
| 452961 ||  || — || December 24, 2006 || Kitt Peak || Spacewatch || — || align=right | 1.8 km || 
|-id=962 bgcolor=#d6d6d6
| 452962 ||  || — || February 8, 2007 || Kitt Peak || Spacewatch || — || align=right | 2.2 km || 
|-id=963 bgcolor=#E9E9E9
| 452963 ||  || — || November 25, 2006 || Mount Lemmon || Mount Lemmon Survey || — || align=right | 3.0 km || 
|-id=964 bgcolor=#E9E9E9
| 452964 ||  || — || November 1, 2006 || Mount Lemmon || Mount Lemmon Survey || JUN || align=right | 1.2 km || 
|-id=965 bgcolor=#d6d6d6
| 452965 ||  || — || February 14, 2007 || Mauna Kea || Mauna Kea Obs. || — || align=right | 2.0 km || 
|-id=966 bgcolor=#d6d6d6
| 452966 ||  || — || February 17, 2007 || Kitt Peak || Spacewatch || — || align=right | 2.1 km || 
|-id=967 bgcolor=#C2FFFF
| 452967 ||  || — || February 17, 2007 || Kitt Peak || Spacewatch || L5 || align=right | 7.6 km || 
|-id=968 bgcolor=#E9E9E9
| 452968 ||  || — || February 21, 2007 || Socorro || LINEAR || — || align=right | 3.4 km || 
|-id=969 bgcolor=#fefefe
| 452969 ||  || — || February 13, 2007 || Socorro || LINEAR || — || align=right | 1.3 km || 
|-id=970 bgcolor=#d6d6d6
| 452970 ||  || — || February 21, 2007 || Kitt Peak || Spacewatch || EOS || align=right | 1.8 km || 
|-id=971 bgcolor=#E9E9E9
| 452971 ||  || — || February 9, 2007 || Kitt Peak || Spacewatch || — || align=right | 2.0 km || 
|-id=972 bgcolor=#E9E9E9
| 452972 ||  || — || February 16, 2007 || Catalina || CSS || — || align=right | 1.9 km || 
|-id=973 bgcolor=#d6d6d6
| 452973 ||  || — || March 9, 2007 || Mount Lemmon || Mount Lemmon Survey || — || align=right | 1.7 km || 
|-id=974 bgcolor=#d6d6d6
| 452974 ||  || — || February 21, 2007 || Mount Lemmon || Mount Lemmon Survey || EMA || align=right | 3.1 km || 
|-id=975 bgcolor=#fefefe
| 452975 ||  || — || March 10, 2007 || Mount Lemmon || Mount Lemmon Survey || — || align=right data-sort-value="0.62" | 620 m || 
|-id=976 bgcolor=#d6d6d6
| 452976 ||  || — || March 9, 2007 || Mount Lemmon || Mount Lemmon Survey || VER || align=right | 3.2 km || 
|-id=977 bgcolor=#d6d6d6
| 452977 ||  || — || March 12, 2007 || Mount Lemmon || Mount Lemmon Survey || — || align=right | 2.8 km || 
|-id=978 bgcolor=#d6d6d6
| 452978 ||  || — || March 14, 2007 || Kitt Peak || Spacewatch || — || align=right | 2.5 km || 
|-id=979 bgcolor=#d6d6d6
| 452979 ||  || — || March 14, 2007 || Kitt Peak || Spacewatch || — || align=right | 2.4 km || 
|-id=980 bgcolor=#d6d6d6
| 452980 ||  || — || March 14, 2007 || Kitt Peak || Spacewatch || — || align=right | 2.5 km || 
|-id=981 bgcolor=#d6d6d6
| 452981 ||  || — || March 13, 2007 || Kitt Peak || Spacewatch || — || align=right | 2.1 km || 
|-id=982 bgcolor=#E9E9E9
| 452982 ||  || — || March 11, 2007 || Catalina || CSS || — || align=right | 2.2 km || 
|-id=983 bgcolor=#d6d6d6
| 452983 ||  || — || March 16, 2007 || Kitt Peak || Spacewatch || — || align=right | 2.3 km || 
|-id=984 bgcolor=#d6d6d6
| 452984 ||  || — || March 20, 2007 || Mount Lemmon || Mount Lemmon Survey || EOS || align=right | 1.5 km || 
|-id=985 bgcolor=#d6d6d6
| 452985 ||  || — || March 15, 2007 || Kitt Peak || Spacewatch || — || align=right | 2.1 km || 
|-id=986 bgcolor=#d6d6d6
| 452986 ||  || — || March 25, 2007 || Mount Lemmon || Mount Lemmon Survey || — || align=right | 2.5 km || 
|-id=987 bgcolor=#fefefe
| 452987 ||  || — || April 6, 2007 || Bergisch Gladbac || W. Bickel || — || align=right | 1.3 km || 
|-id=988 bgcolor=#d6d6d6
| 452988 ||  || — || April 11, 2007 || Kitt Peak || Spacewatch || — || align=right | 2.7 km || 
|-id=989 bgcolor=#d6d6d6
| 452989 ||  || — || April 11, 2007 || Kitt Peak || Spacewatch || — || align=right | 2.9 km || 
|-id=990 bgcolor=#d6d6d6
| 452990 ||  || — || April 14, 2007 || Kitt Peak || Spacewatch || — || align=right | 2.1 km || 
|-id=991 bgcolor=#d6d6d6
| 452991 ||  || — || April 15, 2007 || Kitt Peak || Spacewatch || — || align=right | 2.9 km || 
|-id=992 bgcolor=#fefefe
| 452992 ||  || — || April 15, 2007 || Kitt Peak || Spacewatch || — || align=right data-sort-value="0.66" | 660 m || 
|-id=993 bgcolor=#fefefe
| 452993 ||  || — || April 15, 2007 || Catalina || CSS || — || align=right data-sort-value="0.78" | 780 m || 
|-id=994 bgcolor=#d6d6d6
| 452994 ||  || — || March 26, 2007 || Catalina || CSS || — || align=right | 4.9 km || 
|-id=995 bgcolor=#d6d6d6
| 452995 ||  || — || April 18, 2007 || Mount Lemmon || Mount Lemmon Survey || VER || align=right | 3.0 km || 
|-id=996 bgcolor=#d6d6d6
| 452996 ||  || — || March 16, 2007 || Mount Lemmon || Mount Lemmon Survey || — || align=right | 3.1 km || 
|-id=997 bgcolor=#fefefe
| 452997 ||  || — || October 29, 2005 || Kitt Peak || Spacewatch || — || align=right data-sort-value="0.75" | 750 m || 
|-id=998 bgcolor=#d6d6d6
| 452998 ||  || — || March 16, 2007 || Kitt Peak || Spacewatch || — || align=right | 2.3 km || 
|-id=999 bgcolor=#d6d6d6
| 452999 ||  || — || April 19, 2007 || Mount Lemmon || Mount Lemmon Survey || — || align=right | 2.7 km || 
|-id=000 bgcolor=#d6d6d6
| 453000 ||  || — || April 18, 2007 || Kitt Peak || Spacewatch || — || align=right | 2.3 km || 
|}

References

External links 
 Discovery Circumstances: Numbered Minor Planets (450001)–(455000) (IAU Minor Planet Center)

0452